= 2026 New Year Honours =

British royal recognitions

The 2026 New Year Honours are appointments by King Charles III among the 15 Commonwealth realms to various orders and honours to recognise and reward good works by citizens of those countries. The New Year Honours are awarded as part of the New Year celebrations at the start of January and those for 2026 were announced on 29 December 2025.

The recipients of honours are displayed as styled before appointment to the honour awarded upon the advice of the King's ministers and arranged by country, precedence and grade (i.e., Knight/Dame Grand Cross, Knight/Dame Commander, etc.), and then by divisions (i.e., Civil, Diplomatic, and Military), as appropriate.

== United Kingdom ==
Below are the individuals appointed by Charles III in his right as King of the United Kingdom of Great Britain and Northern Ireland with honours within his own gift or upon the advice of his Government for other honours.

=== Knights Bachelor ===
Ribbon of a Knight Bachelor

- Cedric Nishanthan Canagarajah – Vice-Chancellor, University of Leicester. For services to Higher Education
- Roy Clarke, OBE – Television Writer. For services to Entertainment
- Christopher Colin Dean, OBE – For services to Ice Skating and to Voluntary Service
- Idrissa Akuna Elba, OBE – Activist, Actor and Musician. For services to Young People
- Ian Stewart Forrester, KC – Arbitrator and former Judge. For services to International Law.
- Richard David Harpin – For services to Politics
- Tristram Julian William Hunt – Director, Victoria and Albert Museum. For services to Museums
- The Right Honourable Adam Paterson Ingram – For Parliamentary and Political Service
- Simon Stephen Milne, MBE – Regius Keeper and Chief Executive Officer, Royal Botanic Garden Edinburgh. For services to Botany, Conservation and Horticulture
- John Patrick Robins, QPM DL – Chief Constable, West Yorkshire Police. For services to Policing
- David Neil Robinson, OBE – Co-Founder, The Relationships Project, Co-Founder, Community Links, and Co-Founder, Discover Children's Story Centre. For services to Social Innovation
- Stephen Peter Taylor – Chief Executive Officer, Cabot Learning Federation. For services to Education
- Christopher Stephen Vajda, KC – Barrister and former Judge. For services to International Law.

=== The Most Honourable Order of the Bath ===
Ribbon of the Order of the Bath

==== Knight / Dame Commander of the Order of the Bath (KCB / DCB) ====
Military

- Vice Admiral Michael Keith Utley, CB OBE
- Air Chief Marshal Harvey Smyth CB OBE DFC

Civil

- Sarah Davina Clarke, CVO OBE – Lately Black Rod, House of Lords. For services to Parliament

==== Companion of the Order of the Bath (CB) ====
Military

- Rear Admiral James Miles Benjamin Parkin, CBE
- Lieutenant General Jeremy Matthew James Bennett, CBE
- Major General Sarah Helen Johansen, MBE
- Major General Gerald Mark Strickland, DSO MBE
- Air Vice-Marshal David Scott Arthurton, OBE
- Air Vice-Marshal Timothy David Neal-Hopes, OBE

Civil

- Colum Boyle – Permanent Secretary, Department for Communities, Northern Ireland Civil Service. For Public Service
- Richard William John Clarke – Director General, Public Safety Group, Home Office. For Public Service
- Sophie Dean – Director General, Department for Work and Pensions. For Public Service
- Katherine Green – Director General, Department for Work and Pensions. For Public Service
- Nicholas Joyce – Director General, Corporate Delivery Group, Department for Transport. For services to Transport
- Colin Geoffrey Lee – Lately Clerk of Legislation, Chamber and Participation Team, House of Commons. For services to Parliament
- Daljit Singh Rehal – Chief Digital Information Officer, HM Revenue and Customs. For services to Technology and to Public Service
- Andrew Charles Scott – Second Parliamentary Counsel, Office of the Parliamentary Counsel, Cabinet Office. For services to Government and the Legislative Process
- Joanna Elizabeth Clare Shanmugalingam – Lately Second Permanent Secretary, Department for Transport. For services to Transport and Innovation

=== The Most Distinguished Order of Saint Michael and Saint George ===
Ribbon of the Order of St Michael and St George

==== Dame Grand Cross of the Order of St Michael and St George (GCMG) ====
- Dame Barbara Woodward DCMG OBE – UK Permanent Representative to the United Nations, UK Mission to the United Nations, New York, United States of America. For services to British Foreign Policy.

==== Knight Commander of the Order of St Michael and St George (KCMG) ====
- Tim Eicke KC, lately Judge at the European Court of Human Rights elected in respect of the United Kingdom. For services to the protection of Human Rights in Europe.
- David Mabey CBE, Professor of Communicable Diseases, London School of Hygiene and Tropical Medicine. For services to Global Health.
- Simon Manley CMG, UK Permanent Representative to the United Nations, Geneva, Switzerland. For services to British Foreign Policy.
- Tony Redmond OBE, Founder of UK-Med and Professor Emeritus of International Emergency Medicine, University of Manchester. For services to Humanitarian Medical Assistance.
- Christian Turner CMG, lately Director General, Geopolitics, and Political Director, Foreign, Commonwealth and Development Office. For services to British Foreign Policy.

==== Companion of the Order of St Michael and St George (CMG) ====
- Sarah Cliffe – former Director, New York University’s Center on International Cooperation. For services to Conflict Prevention, Peacebuilding and International Development.
- Nicholas Day – Director, Mahidol Oxford Research Programme and Professor of Tropical Medicine, Oxford University. For services to Global Health.
- Comfort Ekhuase Ero – President and Chief Executive Officer, International Crisis Group. For services to Crisis Response and Conflict Prevention.
- Benjamin Fender OBE – Director Eastern Europe and Central Asia, Foreign, Commonwealth and Development Office. For services to British Foreign Policy.
- Max Gandell OBE – Senior Overseas Security Adviser, Estates, Security and Network Directorate, Foreign, Commonwealth and Development Office. For services to UK Security Overseas.
- Stephen Hickey – Director Middle East and North Africa, Foreign, Commonwealth and Development Office. For services to British Foreign Policy.
- Bethan Rhiannon Hopkins – Director, Foreign, Commonwealth and Development Office. For services to National Security.
- Debbie Palmer – Director, Energy, Climate and Environment, Foreign, Commonwealth and Development Office. For services to International Development.
- George Williamson – Director, HMGCC. For services to National Security.

=== The Royal Victorian Order ===
Ribbon of the Royal Victorian Order

Ribbon of the Royal Victorian Order – Honorary

==== Knight Grand Cross of the Royal Victorian Order (GCVO) ====
- Richard Walter John, Duke of Buccleuch and Queensberry KT KBE CVO – For Public Service.

==== Dame Commander of the Royal Victorian Order (DCVO) ====
- Celia Janes Innes CVO – Senior Lady-in-Waiting to The Princess Royal.
- Charlotte Elizabeth Manley CVO OBE – lately Chapter Clerk, College of St George, Windsor Castle.

==== Commander of the Royal Victorian Order (CVO) ====
- Edmund John Seward Anderson CBE – lately Lord Lieutenant of West Yorkshire.
- The Right Honourable William Jefferson, Baron Hague of Richmond PC – For services to The Royal Foundation and to Nature Conservation.
- Catherine Mary Jones LVO – HR Administration Manager, Royal Household.
- Michael George More-Molyneux – Lord Lieutenant of Surrey.
- Jeanna Catherine Swan – Lord Lieutenant of Berwickshire.

===== Honorary =====
- Adebayo Olawale Edun – Lately Trustee, The Duke of Edinburgh’s International Award Foundation.

==== Lieutenant of the Royal Victorian Order (LVO) ====
- Philip Anthony Bloom – Surgeon Oculist to The King.
- Charles David Seymour Deakin – Travelling Physician to The King and Queen.
- Simon James Eccles – Surgeon to The King and Queen.
- Diane Ivy Eddy MVO – Visitor Enterprise Office and Holiday Cottage Manager, Balmoral Estate.
- Jeffrey Kevin Johnson MVO – Archives Curator, Royal Household.
- John Edward Morton Morris – For services to the Royal Collection.
- Edward George Christian Parsons – Land Agent, Sandringham Estate.
- Ian David Arthur Russell MVO – Registrar and Seneschal of the Cinque Ports.
- William Edward Scott MVO – Head of Fire and Security, The Palace of Holyroodhouse.

Honorary

- David Fein – For services to The Earthshot Prize and to Nature Conservation.
- Aidan David Somers – Manager, Royal Studs, Sandringham.

==== Member of the Royal Victorian Order (MVO) ====
- Jason Michael Baltov – Inspector, New South Wales Police Force.
- Alexandra Z Booth – Head of Visitor Operations (London), Royal Collection Trust.
- Jacques Boucher CD – lately Honours Advisor, Cabinet of the Lieutenant Governor of Québec.
- Jade Yasmin Hayward-Browne – lately Operations Manager (C Branch), Royal Household.
- Katie Charlotte Buckhalter – Press Manager, Royal Collection Trust.
- Paul Lawrence Burch RVM – Warden, Sandringham Estate.
- Paula Anne Fitzpatrick – Senior Protocol Officer, New South Wales Premier’s Department.
- Helen Elizabeth Graham – Events and Programme Manager, Royal Household.
- Daniel Hatton – Constable, Metropolitan Police Service. For services to Royalty and Specialist Protection.
- Kylie Jayne Hunter – Property Project Manager, Royal Household.
- Bruce Ian Kirkpatrick MOM – Chief Superintendent, Royal Canadian Mounted Police.
- Tung Tsin Lam – Photographer, Royal Collection Trust.
- Benjamin John Murphy – lately Estates Director, Duchy of Cornwall.
- Anna-Maria Scott – Senior Project Manager, Buckingham Palace Reservicing Programme, Royal Household.
- Surinder Singh Rawat – Lead Network Engineer, Digital Services, Royal Household.
- Simon James Soley – Senior Landing Site Officer, The King’s Helicopter Flight.
- Jason Stibbs – Fire Surveillance Officer, Royal Household.
- Steven John Tanner – Detective Inspector, Metropolitan Police Service. For services to Royalty and Specialist Protection.
- Jenna Brooke Whitnall – lately Head of Ticketing, Royal Collection Trust.

Honorary

- Alessandro Nasini – Senior Curator of Photographs, Royal Collection Trust.

=== Royal Victorian Medal (RVM) ===
Ribbon of the Royal Victorian Medal

Silver

- Lance Sergeant Scott Robin Bishop – Orderly and Driver to The Prince and Princess of Wales.
- Maria Teresa Turrion Borrallo – For services to The Prince and Princess of Wales.
- Lindsay Alexandra Brooks – Assistant Housekeeper, Royal Household.
- Helen Rosalinde Buckham – Membership and Group Bookings Coordinator, Windsor Great Park.
- Karen Lesley Smyth-Dice – Groom, The Royal Mews, Windsor Castle.
- James Richard Earle – Tractor and Machinery Operator, Open Parks, Windsor Great Park.
- John Anthony Forster – Divisional Sergeant Major, The King’s Bodyguard of the Yeomen of the Guard.
- Philip Edwin Stafford Hall – Warden, Windsor Castle, Royal Collection Trust.
- Verity Anne Hardstaff – Footman, Royal Household.
- Dominic Peter Kent – First Chauffeur, The Royal Mews, Buckingham Palace.
- Barry Luther Morris – Yeoman Bed Goer, The King’s Bodyguard of the Yeomen of the Guard.
- Ludlow Earl Smith – General Catering Assistant, Royal Household.
- Michael Robin Wheatley – lately Verger, St. Mary Magdalene Church, Sandringham.

Honorary (silver)

- Maria Alice Marques Rito de Freitas – lately Housekeeper, Government House, Guernsey.
- Manon Mathilde Gaillard – Page of the Cellars, Royal Household.
- Margaret Concepta Power – Telephone Operator, Royal Household.

=== The Most Excellent Order of the British Empire ===
Ribbon of the Order of the British Empire (Military Division)

Ribbon of the Order of the British Empire (Civil Division)

==== Knight Grand Cross of the Order of the British Empire (GBE) ====
Military

- Admiral Sir Antony David Radakin, KCB

==== Knight / Dame Commander of the Order of the British Empire (KBE / DBE) ====
Military

- Lieutenant General David James Eastman, MBE

Civil

- Sarah Lillian Anderson, CBE – Founder and Trustee, The Listening Place. For services to Mental Health and to Suicide Prevention (to be dated 5 December 2025)
- Polina Bayvel, CBE FREng – Royal Society Research Professor and Professor of Optical Communications and Networks, University College London. For services to Engineering and to Optical Communications
- Sonia Blandford – Professor of Social Mobility, Plymouth Marjon University. For services to Education
- Wendy Joan Carlin, CBE FBA – Professor of Economics, University College London. For services to Economics
- Jayne Christensen (Jayne Torvill), OBE – For services to Ice Skating and to Voluntary Service
- Lorna Anne Dawson, CBE FRSE – Head, Centre for Forensic Soil Science, James Hutton Institute. For services to Innovations in Soil and Forensic Science
- The Right Honourable Anneliese Dodds, MP – Member of Parliament for Oxford East. For Parliamentary and Political Service
- Carol Colburn Grigor – Founder and Director, Dunard Fund UK and USA, President, The Colburn Foundation. For services to the Arts, Culture and Women in the UK.
- Carol Ann Homden, CBE – Chief Executive, Thomas Coram Foundation for Children. For services to Children and Families
- Suzannah Claire Lishman, CBE – Lately President, The Association of Clinical Pathologists and Senior Advisor on Medical Examiners, Royal College of Pathologists. For services to the Medical Examiner System and to Patient Safety
- Amanda Kate Pritchard – Lately Chief Executive, NHS England. For services to the NHS
- Fiona Elizabeth Rayment, OBE FREng FRSE – Non-Executive Director, Trustee and Nuclear Advisor. For services to Nuclear Engineering
- Meera Syal, CBE – Comedian, Writer and Actor. For services to Literature, to Drama and to Charity
- Meena Upadhyaya, OBE – For services to Community Cohesion in Wales and to Medical Genetics

==== Commander of the Order of the British Empire (CBE) ====
Military

- Commodore Sharon Louise Malkin, ADC
- Brigadier Christopher Norman Maurice Patrick Ordway, Royal Marines
- Commodore Roger Brian Readwin
- Brigadier David James Bickers, MBE
- Major General Carl William Boswell
- Brigadier Mark Joffrie Comer
- Brigadier Shay Joseph James Marks
- Air Vice-Marshal Adrian Stewart Burns
- Air Commodore Peter Nigel Cracroft
- Air Vice-Marshal Philip Thomas Giles Lester
- Air Commodore Nicholas Michael Worrall

Civil

- Omar Ali – Global Financial Services Leader, Ernst and Young. For services to the Financial Services Industry
- Ronald William Armour – Interim Permanent Secretary, Department of Education, Northern Ireland Civil Service. For Public Service
- The Right Honourable Jonathan Michael Graham Ashworth – Lately Member of Parliament for Leicester South. For Parliamentary, Political Service and Charitable Advocacy Work on behalf of Children of Alcoholics
- Neeta Avnash Kaur Atkar, MBE JP – Lately Senior Independent Director to the Board, British Business Bank. For services to Small Business Finance and the British Business Bank
- Emma-Louise Avery – Director and Chief Executive, Intelligence and Security Committee of Parliament. For Parliamentary and Public Service
- John Martin Bagshaw – For services to Quantum Science in the Aerospace and Defence Sectors
- Edward James Baker – Chair, Health Services Safety Investigations Body. For services to Healthcare
- Lynne Bernadette Barnes – Principal Lecturer, University of Lancashire. For services to Education
- Paul Bartholomew – Vice-Chancellor, Ulster University. For services to Higher Education and Public Service
- Simon Matthew Baugh – Director General, Government Communication Service, Cabinet Office. For services to Government Communications
- Jill Jannette Freda Belch, OBE FRSE – Professor of Vascular Medicine and Consultant Physician, Ninewells Hospital and Medical School, NHS Tayside. For services to Medicine and Public Health
- Stephen Ernest Belcher – For services to Climate Science
- Colin Booth, OBE – Lately Chief Executive, Luminate Education Group, Yorkshire. For services to Further Education
- Ingrid Stephanie Boyce – Lately President, Law Society of England and Wales and Consultant, Linklaters. For services to the Legal Profession and to Diversity, and to Access to Justice
- Matthew John Brittin – For services to Technology and to Enhancing Digital Skills
- Elizabeth Brooks – Co-Founder, The Rory and Elizabeth Brooks Foundation. For services to Philanthropy
- Lynn Brown, OBE – Lately Chief Executive and Accountable Officer, The Scottish Police Authority. For services to Policing and Public Service
- Peter Bruce – Chief Executive Officer, Entier. For services to the Catering Industry and to Charity
- Deborah Si Yin, Lady Buffini – Chair, Buffini Chao Foundation. For services to Philanthropy and to Young People
- Claire Burgess – Social Worker and Children's Social Care Adviser and Children's Improvement Adviser, Local Government Association. For services to Children's Social Care
- Nigel Richard Clifford – Rector, Lincoln College, University of Oxford. For services to Geography and to Geospatial Data Services
- Helen Frances Cooke – Chief Executive Officer and Founder, MyPlus. For services to Special Educational Needs and Disabilities
- Alice Mary Coote, OBE – Mezzo-Soprano. For services to the Arts
- Kathrine Helen Cowell, OBE DL – Chair, Manchester University NHS Foundation Trust. For services to the NHS
- Teresa Mary Cremin – Professor of Education, The Open University. For services to Education
- Jonathan Davies, OBE – President, Velindre Cancer Care Trust. For services to People with Cancer and to Broadcasting
- Martin Lynn Davies – Chair, Cosmic. For services to Employment Provision for People with Disabilities
- Samantha Louise des forges – Director, Conduct, Equity and Justice, Ministry of Defence. For services to Equity and Justice in Defence
- Hilary May Evans-Newton – Chief Executive Officer, Alzheimer's Research UK. For services to Charity
- Vernon John Everitt – Transport Commissioner, Greater Manchester Combined Authority. For services to Transport
- Margaret Ewing – Non-Executive Director, ITV. For services to Finance
- Suzanne Farid, FREng – Professor of Bioprocess Systems Engineering and Head of Biochemical Engineering, University College London. For services to Biochemical Engineering
- Richard Haworth Farnes – Conductor. For services to Music
- Julia Fawcett, OBE – Chief Executive Officer, The Lowry. For services to Art and Creative Industry
- Paul Finch, OBE – Founder, World Architecture Festival. For services to Architecture
- Rhona Hunter Flin – Emeritus Professor of Applied Psychology, University of Aberdeen, Professor of Industrial Psychology, Robert Gordon University and Academic Advisor, Royal College of Surgeons of Edinburgh. For services to Research
- James Alexander Fogg – Programme Director, Ministry of Defence. For services to Defence
- Piers Maxwell de Ferranti Forster – Interim Chair, Climate Change Committee and Professor of Physical Climate Change, University of Leeds. For services to Tackling Climate Change
- Catherine Francis – Director of New Towns, Infrastructure and Housing Delivery, Ministry of Housing, Communities and Local Government. For Public Service
- Gary Green – former Group Chief Operating Officer, North America, Compass Group and Business Advisor. For services to International Business, Industry and the UK Economy.
- Orlando Gregory Fraser, KC – Lately Chair, Charity Commission for England and Wales. For Charitable and Public Service
- Luisa Maria Freitas dos santos, FREng – Vice-President, Global Clinical Supply Chain, GlaxoSmithKline. For services to Pharmaceutical Engineering
- David Charles Gemmell Garbutt, QPM – Chair, NHS Education for Scotland. For services to the Health and Social Care Sector
- Sarah Elizabeth Gawley – Lately Director, Fire, Resilience and Major Events, Home Office. For services to Public Protection
- Judith Ann Gould – Consultant Clinical Psychologist, National Autistic Society. For services to People with Autism
- Debra Jane Gray, MBE – Principal, Hull College, Yorkshire. For services to Further Education
- Thomas George William Greig – Director, Passports, Citizenship and Civil Registration and Registrar General for England and Wales. For Public Service
- Gideon Mark Henderson, FRS – Professor of Earth Sciences, University of Oxford and lately Chief Scientific Adviser, Department for Environment, Food and Rural Affairs. For services to Science
- Dorothea Amanda Hodge – Special Adviser, Labour Party. For Parliamentary and Political Service
- Gary Andrew Hoffman – Chair, Monzo Bank Holding Group Limited and Monzo Bank Limited. For services to the Economy and to Sport
- Edward George Holder – Team Leader, Ministry of Defence. For services to Defence
- Shazia Hussain – Director of Children's Social Care, Department for Education. For services to Children and Families
- Mary Catherine Hutton – Lately Chief Executive, NHS Gloucestershire Integrated Care Board. For services to the NHS and to Community Wellbeing
- Deborah Anna Jones – Lately Executive Director Children, Families and Education Services, Croydon Council. For services to Children, Young People and Families
- David Thomas Kemp, FRS – Emeritus Professor of Auditory Biophysics, University College London. For services to Auditory Sciences and Public Health
- Ian Graham King – Lately Chief Executive Officer, BAE Systems and Lead Non-Executive Director, Department for Transport. For services to the Transport and Defence Sectors
- Daniel Philip Levy – Lately Chair, Tottenham Hotspur. For services to Charity and the community in Tottenham
- Alexandra Rose Mahon – Lately Chief Executive Officer, Channel 4. For services to Broadcasting and Diversity
- Neil Stuart Martin, OBE – Chief Executive, Jewish Lads' and Girls' Brigade. For services to Young People, to Interfaith Relations and to Holocaust Remembrance
- Matilda Rosemary Mcauliffe – Treasurer, Liberal Democrats. For Parliamentary and Political Service
- Fergus John Mccann – Businessman and Philanthropist. For services to the Economy and to Charity
- Hilary McGrady – Director General, National Trust. For services to Heritage
- Andrew James McNaughton, FREng – Executive Director Infrastructure Projects, AWE plc. For services to National Infrastructure
- Ann Denise McNeill – Professor of Tobacco Addiction, King's College London. For services to Research into Addiction and Mental Health
- Rupesh Mohan Mehta – Lately Director, Planning, Department for Transport. For services to Transport Planning
- Sebastian John Munden – Chair, Pack UK Steering Group and Chair, WRAP (The Waste and Resources Action Programme). For services to Business and to the Circular Economy
- Robert John Nixon, QPM DL – Lately Chief Constable, Leicestershire Police and National Police Chief's Council Criminal Justice Lead. For services to Policing and Criminal Justice
- Lisa Marie O'loughlin – Principal and Chief Executive Officer, East Lancashire Learning Group. For services to Further Education
- Dhruv Prashant Patel, OBE – For services to Civic Leadership and to Charity
- Zelda Luna Nico Rabaud Perkins – Founder, Can't Buy My Silence. For services to Social Justice
- His Honour Judge Patrick Peruško – Designated Family Judge, Family Drug and Alcohol Court. For services to the Administration of Justice
- John Pettigrew – Lately Chief Executive Officer, National Grid. For services to Energy
- Rita Emilia Anna, The Honourable Lady Rae, KC – For services to the Law, to Charity and to Education in Scotland
- Suzanne Rastrick, OBE – Chief Allied Health Professions Officer, NHS England. For services to the Allied Health Professions and to the Social Housing Sector
- Mark Peter Reynolds – Group Executive Chair, Mace and Co-Chair, Construction Leadership Council. For services to Business and the Construction Industry
- Max Richter – Composer. For services to Music
- Susan Rigby, FRSE – Principal and Vice-Chancellor, Edinburgh Napier University and lately Vice-Chancellor, Bath Spa University. For services to Higher Education
- Cathryn Elizabeth Riley – Lately Chair and Non-Executive Director, AA Insurance Services, Financial Services Compensation Scheme, Liberty Managing Agency Ltd, Nucleus Financial Group. For services to Business Leadership and Inclusion
- Simon John Roberts – Chief Executive Officer, Sainsbury's. For services to the Retail Industry
- Jennifer Kateman Rubin – Chief Scientific Adviser and Director General, Home Office. For services to Science and Analysis
- Angela Elizabeth Salt, OBE – Lately Chief Executive Officer, Girlguiding. For services to Girlguiding
- Heather Ann Sandy – Executive Director of Children's Services, Lincolnshire County Council. For services to Education
- Andrew John Scott – Professor of Economics, London Business School and Senior Director of Economics, Ellison Institute of Technology, Oxford. For services to Economics
- Sarah Catherine Sharples, FREng – Lately Chief Scientific Adviser, Department for Transport. For services to Transportation, to Manufacturing Research and to Equality, Diversity and Inclusion
- Oonagh Smyth – Chief Executive Officer, Skills for Care. For services to Adult Social Care
- Kay Taylor – Director Legal, National Crime Agency. For services to Law Enforcement
- Martin Anthony Tett – Councillor and lately Leader, Buckinghamshire Council. For Political and Public Service
- Antony Justin Travers – Professor in Practice and Associate Dean, London School of Economics, School of Public Policy. For Public Service
- Peter James Vaughan, QPM – Professor and Director of the International Centre for Policing and Security at the University of South Wales. For services to Criminal Justice
- Jonathan Wadsworth – Professor of Economics at Royal Holloway College, University of London. For services to Economics and to Public Service
- William Geddie Watt – Chair, The Scottish National Investment Bank. For services to the Economy
- Patrice Suzanne Wellesley-Cole – President, Graduate Women International. For services to Charity
- Kim Wilkie – Landscape Architect. For services to Landscape Architecture
- Leah Cathrine Williamson, OBE – Athlete, England Senior Women's Football Team. For services to Association Football.

==== Officer of the Order of the British Empire (OBE) ====
Military

- Captain Alistair Clack, Royal Auxiliary Fleet
- Commander Sean Dufosee, MBE
- Lieutenant Colonel David Hartley, Royal Marines
- Captain Simon Herbert, Royal Fleet Auxiliary
- Captain Mohayed Mohamed Mustafa Magzoub
- Commander Mandy McBain, MBE
- Commander Robert William Moore
- Commodore Stephanie Pearman
- Lieutenant Colonel Finlay Bibby, The Royal Yorkshire Regiment
- Colonel Duncan Alan Chamberlain
- Colonel Geraint Martin Davies
- Lieutenant Colonel Johann Amrit Jeevaratnam, Royal Army Medical Service
- Colonel Andrew James Maskell
- Lieutenant Colonel Alistair James Morriss, Army Cadet Force
- Colonel Ceri Myrline Morton
- Lieutenant Colonel Paula Janet Nicholas, MBE, Adjutant General’s Corps (Staff and Personnel Support Branch)
- Lieutenant Colonel Garrett James O'Leary, Royal Regiment of Artillery
- Lieutenant Colonel Jeremy Rhyen Pattinson, The Royal Logistic Corps
- Colonel James Francis Peycke
- Lieutenant Colonel James Andrew Seddon, Grenadier Guards
- Lieutenant Colonel Harry Guy Simpson, The Royal Lancers (Queen Elizabeths' Own)
- Wing Commander Frederic Yves Gagnon
- Group Captain Paul Anthony Hanson
- Group Captain Andrew Peter March
- Squadron Leader Alison Faith McDowell
- Wing Commander Richard Podmore
- Group Captain James Peter Radley

Civil

- Christopher Adelsbach – Managing Partner Outrun Ventures. For services to Entrepreneurship
- Olukemi Helen Ademola – Quality Assurance Performance Specialist, Department for Work and Pensions. For Public Service
- Dwomoa Adu – Honorary Consultant Nephrologist and Senior Research Fellow, University of Ghana Medical School. For services to treating Kidney Disease in the UK and Overseas.
- Matthew Agar – Strategy Director, Building Digital UK. For services to Digital Infrastructure and Broadband
- Marion Elaine Hamilton Allford – For Charitable Service
- Shah Ruhul Amin – Co-Founder and Chief Architect, Onfido. For services to Fintech and Artificial Intelligence
- Syed Saeed Ashraf – Consultant Cardiothoracic Surgeon, Morriston Hospital, Swansea. For services to Cardiac Surgery, the Provision of Training Surgeons from Abroad, and Academic Contribution
- Anne Aslett – Global Chief Executive Officer, The Elton John Aids Foundation. For services to HIV, Healthcare, and equality in the UK and globally.
- Jeffrey David Asser – Assistant Director, Department for Energy Security and Net Zero. For services to the North Sea Transition
- Tracy Aust – Lately Principal and Chief Executive Officer, West Thames College, London. For services to Further Education
- Mark Bamforth – Executive Chairman, Kincell Bio and General Partner of Kineticos AMR Accelerator Fund, United States of America. For services to UK Life Sciences and to UK/USA business relations.
- Debbie Elizabeth Bartlett – Lately Deputy Director, Protect and Prepare, Home Office. For Public Service
- Anita Frances Maria Bath – Chief Executive Officer, Bishop Bewick Catholic Education Trust, Newcastle, North Tyneside and Northumberland. For services to Education
- Alessandra Bellini – Lately President, Advertising Association. For services to Advertising and Marketing
- Yoshua Bengio FRS – Scientific Director, Canada’s Artificial Intelligence Hub; UK Special Artificial Intelligence Advisor and Member of the United Nations' Scientific Advisory Board. For services to Artificial Intelligence in the UK.
- Craig Bennett – Chief Executive Officer, The Wildlife Trusts. For services to the Environment
- Sarah Gwendoline Beresford – Associate, Prison Reform Trust. For services to Children with Parents in the Criminal Justice System
- Jonathan Bishop – Chief Executive Officer and Executive Headteacher, Cornerstone Academy Trust, Devon. For services to Education
- His Honour Judge Jeffrey Blackett – For services to Justice and to Charitable Causes
- Janet Elizabeth Blake – Academic and Cultural Heritage Expert. For services to Intangible Cultural Heritage and to Cultural Heritage Law
- Allison Elizabeth Booth – Deputy Director, Foreign, Commonwealth and Development Office. For services to National Security.
- Simon Peter Boyd – Managing Director, John Reid and Sons Limited, REIDSteel. For services to British Steel Manufacturing and to Small and Medium-Sized Enterprises
- Derek Michael Brewer – Lately Board Adviser, England and Wales Cricket Board. For services to Cricket
- Elizabeth Jane Nisbet Brown (Betty Brown) – Campaigner for Subpostmasters. For services to Justice
- Ann Cochrane Cook Wallace Budge – Lately Chair and Chief Executive Officer, Heart of Midlothian Football Club. For services to Sport and to the community in Midlothian
- Senay Bulbul – Political Counsellor, British Embassy Washington, United States of America. For services to British Foreign Policy.
- Robbie Bulloch – lately Director Gibraltar Negotiations, Foreign, Commonwealth and Development Office. For services to Gibraltar negotiations with the European Commission and Spain.
- John George Burns – Chief Operating Officer, NHS Scotland. For services to the NHS in Scotland
- Jane Burston – Founder and Chief Executive Officer, Clean Air Fund. For services to Air Quality
- Sarah Jane Burton – Head of Detention Progression Returns Command, Home Office. For Public Service
- Joanna Louise Butlin – Founder, Director and Chair of the Women's Utility Network. For services to Net Zero and to Diversity in the Energy Sector.
- Gaynell Hayward-Caesar – Sexual Assault Response Team Coordinator, and retired Nurse. For services to Healthcare in the community in Bermuda.
- Rose Caldwell – Chief Executive Officer, Plan International UK. For services to International Humanitarian Aid and Development.
- Jenifer Frances Mary Cameron – Chief Executive, Action 4 Youth. For Charitable Service
- Bruce Carter – former Chairman of the Board, TB ALLIANCE. For services to the Treatment of Tuberculosis.
- Nathaniel Roger Blair Cary – Forensic Pathologist, Forensic Pathology Services. For services to Forensic Pathology
- Elizabeth Pamela Checkley – Deputy Director for Legal Aid, Policy Group. For services to Access to Justice
- Pamela Ann Dean Clark – Lately Board Vice-Chair, NHS Highland. For services to the NHS
- Teresa Clay – Head of Local Government and Fire Pensions, Ministry of Housing, Communities and Local Government. For Public Service
- Jane Cole – Managing Director, Blackpool Transport Services Ltd. For services to Public Transport and to the community in Blackpool
- Paule Constable – Lighting Designer. For services to Theatre
- John Michael Newton Cooper – Lately Chair, Cooper Car Company. For services to the Automotive Industry
- Michael Alan Cooper – Founder and Director, Waste to Wonder Network. For services to Charity and to Sustainability
- Carol Ann Copstick – Head of Inspection, HM Inspectorate, Education Scotland. For services to Education
- Saffron Cordery – Lately Deputy Chief Executive Officer, NHS Providers. For services to the NHS
- Daniel Richard Corry – Lately Lead, Independent Review of the Department for Environment, Food and Rural Affairs Regulatory Landscape. For Public Service
- Beverley Anne Craig – Leader of Manchester City Council. For services to Local Government.
- James Philip Craig – For services to Scottish Association Football and to Charity
- Carla Cressy – Founder and Chief Executive Officer, The Endometriosis Foundation. For services to Charity and to Women's Health
- Gordon Dan Raffan Cruickshank – Architectural Historian, Writer, Broadcaster and Campaigner. For services to Architecture
- David Ian Cutler – Director, Baring Foundation. For services to Charity
- Kirsty Lawrie Darwent – Chair, Scottish Fire and Rescue Service and Chair, Redress Scotland. For services to the People of Scotland
- Elizabeth Janet Davies – Social Worker, lately Child Protection Manager and Trainer, Harrow Social Services, and Founder and lately Co-Ordinator, Islington Survivors Network. For services to Child Protection
- Hywel Davies – Head of Technical Insight, Chartered Association of Building Engineers. For services to Building Safety and Standards
- Nadine Jane Davies – Group Director for Wales and The Marches, Department for Work and Pensions. For Public Service
- Warwick Ashley Davis – Actor. For services to Drama and Charity
- Anna Victoria Dawe – Chief Executive Officer and Principal, Wigan and Leigh College, Greater Manchester. For services to Further Education
- Samantha De souza (samantha dowling) – Programme Director, Economic Crime and Cyber Crime Research and Analysis, Home Office. For Public Service
- David James Dickson – For services to Business and to Charitable Causes
- Fiona Alison Donald – Lately President, Royal College of Anaesthetists. For services to Anaesthesia, Intensive Care and Pain Medicine
- Anna Madeline du Boisson – Dance Teacher and Founder, Du Boisson Dance Foundation. For services to Dance
- The Reverend Professor Dee Dyas – Emeritus Professor in History and Director, Centre for the Study of Christianity and Culture, University of York. For services to Theology and to Heritage
- Jeffrey Edwards MBE DL – For services to Survivors of Disasters, to Charity and to the community in Aberfan
- Simon Elliott – Chief Executive Officer, Community Schools Trust. For services to Education
- Karen Ruth Emanuel – Founder and Chief Executive Officer, Key Production Group. For services to Music
- Emma Kate English – Executive Director, British Educational Travel Association. For services to the Youth and Student Travel Industry
- Ekow Eshun – Lately Director, Institute of Contemporary Arts, Writer and Curator. For services to the Arts
- Margaret Evison – Executive Trustee, Mark Evison Foundation. For services to Young People
- Gail Faulkner – Head Consultant, Leeds Relational Practice Centre, Leeds City Council. For services to Children's Social Work Service
- Julie Feest – Chief Executive Officer, Engineering Development Trust. For services to Young People
- Alexander Gregory Fell – President, Association of Directors of Public Health and Director of Public Health, Sheffield City Council. For services to Public Health
- Michelle Ferguson – Director, Confederation British Industry Scotland. For services to the Economy
- Jo Field – Chair, Women in Transport. For services to Diversity and Inclusion in Transport.
- Julie Firth – Director of Children's Services, North Tyneside Council, Tyne and Wear. For services to Children, Families and Young People
- Alan Keith Fletcher – Lately National Medical Examiner for England and Wales, NHS England. For services to the NHS
- Clare Elizabeth Flintoff – Lately Chief Executive Officer, Asset Education, Ipswich, Suffolk. For services to Education
- Susan Elisabeth Flood – Photographer, Filmmaker, Author and Explorer. For services to Conservation, to Science and to the Natural World
- Tracy Foster – Chief Guide, Girlguiding. For services to Girlguiding
- Nicholas Paul David Fowler – Head of Central Resilience Command, Home Office. For services to the Protection of Children
- Paul Robert Freeston – Lately Chair and Chief Executive Officer, apetito. For services to the Food and Drink Industry
- Bob Garmory – Volunteer, Multibank. For services to the community in Fife
- Katharine Garvey – For Parliamentary and Political Service
- Abby Ghafoor – Founder and Chief Executive Officer, Arc Management Consulting. For services to Business and to Diversity and Inclusion
- John Edward Gormley – Lately Governor HM Prison The Mount, HM Prison and Probation Service. For Public Service
- Ian Greaves – Co-Founder, Trauma Care and Patron, Magpas Air Ambulance. For services to Pre-Hospital Care
- Simon Grunwell – Deputy Director, Covert Operations Digital Exploitation. For Public Service
- Danielle Gunn-Moore – Feline Veterinary Surgeon, The University of Edinburgh and Member, The Feline Infectious Peritonitis Advisory Group. For services to Feline Veterinary Medicine
- Michael de La Roche Gunton – For services to Documentary Filmmaking
- Jonathan Hague – Executive, Unilever and Chair, Liverpool City Region Innovation Board. For services to Research, Innovation and Economic Development
- Sylvia Halkerston – Lord Dean of Guild of the Burgesses of Guild of the City of Aberdeen. For services to Education and to Young People
- Bassam Hallis – Deputy Director, Vaccine Development, Evaluation and Preparedness, Health Security Agency. For services to Vaccine Development, Pandemic Preparedness and Overall Resilience
- Julia Catherine Heap – Principal and Chief Executive Officer, Hopwood Hall College, Rochdale, Greater Manchester. For services to Further Education
- Rachael Ellen Hennigan – Principal and Chief Executive Officer, Hugh Baird College, Merseyside. For services to Further Education
- Nancy Jane Juliet Hey – Lately Executive Director, What Works Centre for Wellbeing. For services to Wellbeing and Tackling Loneliness
- Peter John Higgins – Co-Founder, Charles Tyrwhitt Shirts. For services to Commerce, to Entrepreneurship and to Education
- Charlotte Hodges – Principal Forensic Psychologist, HM Prison Isle of Wight, HM Prison and Probation Service. For services to Rehabilitation in a Prison Setting
- Claire Kathleen Holland – Leader, Lambeth Council. For services to Local Government
- Louise Holliday – Deputy Director, Home Office. For services to National Security
- Joe William Homshaw – Team Leader, Ministry of Defence. For services to Defence.
- Leo Horn-Phathanothai – Founder and Chief Executive Officer, Just Transitions Incubator; Founder and Convenor, Bangkok Climate Action Week. For services to International Development and tackling Climate Change.
- Jane Louise Hubert – Head of Quality for Acute Specialised Commissioned Services, Direct and Specialised Commissioning Quality Team, South East Region, NHS England. For services to Cancer Patients
- Martin James Humphries FMedSci – Professor of Biochemistry, University of Manchester. For services to Bioscience
- Philip Robert Henry Ind – Senior Engineering Manager, AWE plc. For services to Defence
- Catherine Inglehearn MBE – British Ambassador to Niger. For services to British Foreign Policy.
- Mohamed Isap – Chief Executive, IN4 Group. For services to Education
- Kenneth Isaac – lately Head of DCAF (Geneva Centre for Security Sector Governance) Country Office, Banjul, The Gambia. For services to the Security Sector in the UK and Overseas, specifically in The Gambia.
- Helen Jacklin – Team Leader, Ministry of Defence. For services to Defence
- Gurpreet Singh Jagpal – For services to Enterprise, Entrepreneurship Education and Policy
- Anna Lisa Mary Jenkins – For services to Life Sciences
- Linda Susan Jones – Chief Executive Officer, Prospere Learning Trust. For services to Education
- Matthew Daniel Jones – Leader, National Youth Arts Wales. For services to Music
- Wyn Gwilym Jones – Prison Director and Governor, HM Prison Fosse Way, HM Prison and Probation Service. For Public Service
- Colette Marion Kane – Director, Northern Ireland Audit Office and Local Government Auditor. For services to the Northern Ireland Audit Office
- Rukshana Kapasi – Director of Health, Barnardo 's. For services to Transforming Care, to Health Equity and to the Patient Voice
- Rachel Karrach – Director, Tansen Mission Hospital, Tansen (UMHT), Nepal. For service to Healthcare in Nepal.
- Jeremy Kelley – Founder, Board Chair and Lifetime Trustee, Myotonic Dystrophy Foundation. For services to supporting families suffering from Myotonic Dystrophy in the UK and Overseas.
- Stephen John Kerr – Director, Social Security, The Scottish Government. For services to Public Service Reform
- Ewan Kindness – Specialist Programme Delivery Manager, Jakarta Centre for Law Enforcement Cooperation (JCLEC). For services to Advancing Counter Terrorism collaboration in Southeast Asia.
- Harjinder Singh Lallie – Founder, Gurmat Sangeet Academy. For services to Musical Heritage, to Faith Communities and to Integration
- Sarah Lee – Deputy Director, Education, Employment and Skills, HM Prison and Probation Service. For Public Service
- Ruth-Anne Lenga – Associate Professor, University College London, Institute of Education. For services to Holocaust Education
- Francis Christopher Lewis – Deputy Chair, Maritime Transport Limited. For services to the Ports and Logistics Industry
- Paul Lewis – Firmwide Managing Partner, Linklaters LLP. For services to the community in Newport
- Beate Lewkowicz – Co-Founder and Project Director, Refugee Voices, Association of Jewish Refugees. For services to Holocaust Remembrance and Education
- Gabrielle Nicole Logan MBE – Broadcaster. For services to Sports Broadcasting and to Charity
- Matthew Richard Lucas – Comedian, Actor and Writer. For services to Drama
- Angus Maclennan – Lately Head Teacher, e-Sgoil. For services to Education and Gaelic
- John Kingsley Maiden – Deputy Head Operational Spending, Ministry of Defence. For services to Defence
- Nicola Marfleet – Lately Governing Governor, HM Prison Woodhill, HM Prison and Probation Service. For Public Service
- Maria Mercedes Maroto valer FRSE – Director, Research Centre for Carbon Solutions, Heriot-Watt University. For services to Low Energy Technologies
- Tamsin Alice Mather FRS – Professor of Earth Sciences, University of Oxford. For services to Volcanology and to the Promotion of Science
- Pamela Maynard – Chief AI Transformation Officer, Microsoft. For services to Business and Technology
- Philip Steven McBride – Lately Managing Director, Thales Northern Ireland. For services to the Defence Industry
- Patrick McCabe – lately Programme Manager, Explosive Ordnance Device Operations, United Nations Mine Action Service Occupied Palestinian Territory (UNMASOPT), Palestine. For services to the safe disposal of Explosive Ordnance Devices in Gaza.
- Jayne Louise McCann – Deputy Director, Participation, Department for Business and Trade. For services to Employment Rights
- Alison McEwen – lately British Deputy Consul General, British Consulate-General Jerusalem. For services to British Foreign Policy.
- David John McDonald – Chair, Institute of Historic Building Conservation. For services to the Historic Built Environment and to Charity
- William Martin Wallace McDowell – Chair, Odyssey Trust. For services to Charity and to Public Services in Northern Ireland
- Maria McIlgorm – Chief Nursing Officer. For services to Nursing and Midwifery in Northern Ireland
- Robert Davis McIntosh – Managing Director, North West and Central, Network Rail. For Services to the Railway in the North of England.
- Scarlett Armorel Mcnally – Consultant Orthopaedic Surgeon, East Sussex Healthcare NHS Trust and Deputy Director, Centre for Perioperative Care. For services to Medicine, Surgery and the NHS
- Ian Lee Merrill – Lately Chief Executive The Shannon Trust. For services to Rehabilitation
- Zosia Miedzybrodzka – Service Clinical Director, Genetics, NHS Grampian and Professor of Medical Genetics, University of Aberdeen. For services to Medical Genetics and Research
- Aled Miles – Welsh Government Envoy to the United States of America. For services to the Economy and the promotion of the Welsh Technology Sector.
- Deborah Kellsey Millar – Director of Digital Transformation, Hull College. For services to Further Education
- Simon Mark Millson – Chair, Kaleidoscope Trust. For services to the LGBTQ+ Community
- John Eric Paul Mitchell – Head Coach, England Women's Rugby Union Team. For services to Rugby Union
- Paul David Mizen – Professor and Vice Dean, King's Business School, King's College London. For services to Economic Research and Public Policy
- Eamonn Mark Molloy – Chairman, Royal Air Force Central Fund. For services to the Royal Air Force
- Samantha Molyneux – Team Leader, Ministry of Defence. For services to Defence
- Charlotte Moore – Lately BBC Chief Content Officer. For services to Public Service Broadcasting
- Tara Moore – Professor of Personalised Medicine, Ulster University. For services to Research, Innovation and Education
- Carolyn Morgan – Lately Chief Executive Officer, The Ascent Academies' Trust, Sunderland, Tyne and Wear. For services to Special Educational Needs and Disabilities
- Alison Jane Morton – Chief Executive Officer, Institute of Health Visiting. For services to Health Visiting
- Kathleen Murray – For services to Children's Hearings in Scotland
- James Anthony Nichols – Deputy Head of Centre, Ministry of Defence. For services to Defence
- Michael Lennard Nicholson – Professor of Transplant Surgery, University of Cambridge. For services to Kidney Transplantation
- Richard Michael Nixon – Team Leader, Operations Directorate, Defence Equipment and Support. For services to Defence
- Robert Jan Michiel Nolan – Chair, Board of Trustees, Deafblind UK. For services to People Living with Deafblindness
- Sarah Norman – Chief Executive, Barnsley Council. For services to Local Government
- Barry John O'Brien – For services to the Law, to Cricket and to Charity
- Gloria Natasha Ogborn – Lately British Sign Language Interpreter, Expert Witness and Legal Interpreting Trainer. For services to British Sign Language and Deaf Communities
- Akin Onal – Founder and Chief Executive Officer, MORI. For services to Entrepreneurship
- Richard Thomas Osman – Author and Television Presenter. For services to Literature and Broadcasting
- Marie Sarah Owen – Founder and Chief Executive Officer, LS Productions. For services to the Creative Industries and to Economic Development
- Deputy Jayne Margaret Ozanne – Founder and Director, Ozanne Foundation. For services to Religion and the LGBTQ+ Community
- Marlie Marie Packer – For services to Rugby Union Football
- Cassa Pancho MBE – Founder and Artistic Director, Ballet Black. For services to Ballet
- Phillip Alexander Patterson – Lately Sector Specialist, Department for Business and Trade. For services to Export and to the Music Industry
- Benjamin Toby Pentreath – Designer. For services to Design
- Sarah-Jane Catherine Perry – Squash Player, Grassroots Champion and Mentor. For services to Squash
- Roger James Phillips JP – Councillor. For services to the community in Herefordshire
- Charlotte Pierre – lately British High Commissioner to Mauritius. For services to British Foreign Policy.
- Lady (Demetra Aikaterini) Pinsent – Chief Executive Officer, Charlotte Tilbury. For services to Business and to the Beauty Industry
- Marcia Rachel Pointon – Art Historian and Trustee, Art Fund. For services to the Visual Arts
- The Hon. Paavan Popat – Chief Executive, TLC Care. For services to Intergenerational Housing
- Stuart Alexander Mackenzie Pringle – Chief Executive Officer, Silverstone Circuit. For services to Motorsport
- Joanna Melancy Lyndon Prior – Chief Executive Officer, Pan Macmillian. For services to Publishing and Literacy
- Christopher Bryn Pritchard – Chair, Scottish Mathematical Council, Secretary, James Clerk Maxwell Foundation and lately President of The Mathematical Association. For services to Mathematics Education
- Joanne Elizabeth Quinton-Tulloch – Director, National Science and Media Museum. For services to the Arts
- Paula Jane Radcliffe MBE – Broadcaster and Athlete. For services to Sport
- Michael Raine – Programme Manager, APOPO Cambodia. For services to Humanitarian Land Mine Clearance and Explosive Ordnance Disposal Overseas.
- Mark Stobart Rawlinson – Lead Non-Executive Director, Ministry of Justice. For Public Service
- Robert Steven Razzell – Lately Chief Financial Officer, UK Government Investments. For services to Public Finance and to Defence
- Ann Muriel Remmers – Maternal and Neonatal Clinical Lead, Health Innovation West of England. For services to Maternal and Neonatal Care
- Gaynor Alison Rennie – Lately Headteacher, All Souls Church of England Primary School, Heywood, Lancashire. For services to Education
- Tara Frances Renton – Emeritus Professor in Oral Surgery, King's College London. For services to Dentistry
- Emma Dannette Revie – Chief Executive Officer, Trussell. For services to the Eradication of Poverty
- James Patrick Reville – Lately Community Resilience Manager, Community Resilience, Civil Contingencies Division, Scottish Government. For services to Community Resilience in Scotland
- Alexander Luke Rhodes – Founding Trustee, Elephant Protection Initiative and Trustee and Chair, Tusk Trust. For services to Global Conservation.
- Alexander Rhys – Founder, It Gets Better UK. For services to Healthcare and to the LGBTQ+ Community
- Paul Thompson Rickeard – Ecumencial Canon, Cathedral of Newcastle upon Tyne and Chief Executive Officer, Durham and Newcastle Diocesan Learning Trust, Tyne and Wear. For services to Education
- Ann-Marie Riley – Chief Nurse, University Hospitals of North Midlands NHS Trust. For services to Nursing
- Michael Robins – Team Leader, Ministry of Defence. For services to Defence
- Anna Rose – Head, Planning Advisory Service. For Public Service
- Christopher Shaun Ruane – Lately Member of Parliament for Vale of Clwyd. For Parliamentary and Political Service and to Wellbeing
- Mark Kenneth Russell – Chief Executive Officer, The Children's Society. For services to Charity
- Sara Russell – Principal and Chief Executive Officer, Peter Symonds College, Hampshire. For services to Further Education
- Gary John Ryan – Executive Director, Marketing, Remembrance and Fundraising, The Royal British Legion. For services to the Armed Forces Community
- Christine Salmon Percival – Clerk, Hybrid and Private Legislation, House of Lords. For services to Parliament
- David Sampson – Deputy Director, Baring Foundation. For services to LGBT+ equality in the UK and Overseas.
- Vivien Sanders – Principal Officer, Cabinet Office. For Public Service
- Aderonke Matilda Adebiren Savage – Chief Executive Officer and Founder, Jomas Associates Ltd. For services to Young People, to Business and to the Construction Industry
- Nikolaos Savvas DL – Chief Executive Officer, West Suffolk College, West Suffolk Trust, and Eastern Education Group, and Principal Abbeygate Sixth Form College, Suffolk. For services to Further Education
- Andrew Iain Scraggs – Navy Logistics Commodities Team Leader, Royal Navy. For services to Defence
- Anna Gretchen Selby – Executive Director of Quality, HC-One. For services to Adult Social Care
- Andrew Charles Sellins – Lately Chief Executive Officer, The Change Foundation. For Charitable Service
- Joanna Katharine Tutchener Sharp – Founder, Scamp & Dude. For services to Fashion and to Charity
- Nadia Shehzi Fall – Chief Executive Officer and Artistic Director, Young Vic Theatre and lately Chief Executive Officer and Artistic Director, Theatre Royal Stratford East. For services to Theatre
- Narinder Kaur Shergill – Security Advisor, Serious Fraud Office. For services to the Administration of Justice
- Timothy William Sherriff – Vice-Chair, Chartered Institute of Educational Assessors. For services to Education
- Giles Robert Evelyn Shilson – Lately Chair, City Bridge Foundation. For services to Outreach and Inclusion and to Charity
- Stephen John Shortt – General Practitioner, Village Health Group. For services to General Practice
- Celine Sinclair – Chief Executive, The Yard. For services to Children and Families
- Jeanette Margaret Smart – Lately Development Officer, Food for Thought Education Fund, Education Scotland. For services to Food and Health Education
- Richard Smith – Board Member and Supervisor, British Chamber of Commerce Taipei. For services to UK Education and the British Community in Taiwan.
- William George Stewart Smith – Chief Executive Officer and Founder, Greenshaw Learning Trust. For services to Education
- Enver Solomon – Chief Executive Officer, The Refugee Council. For services to Refugee Resettlement
- Ethan Robert Spibey – For services to Blood Donation Equality and Inclusion
- Neil Squires – Secretary General, The International Association of National Public Health Institutes. For services to Global Public Health.
- Andrew Patrick Arthur Steptoe FBA FMedSci – Professor of Psychology and Epidemiology, University College London. For services to Behavioural Science
- Marion Anne Stoker – Director of Children and Family Services, Enfield Council. For services to Social Work
- Zoe Rosalind Stratford (Zoe Aldcroft) – For services to Rugby Union Football
- Francis Edwin Stuart – Head of Employee Relations, HM Prison and Probation Service. For Public Service
- Katherine Amelia Stuart – Team Leader, Foreign, Commonwealth and Development Office. For services to British Foreign Policy.
- Thomas Brendan Tapping – Chief Executive Officer, Bishop Chadwick Catholic Education Trust, Houghton-le-Spring, Tyne and Wear. For services to Education
- Wendy Joy Tapping – Chief Executive, Hands on Payroll Giving. For services to Fundraising
- Lesley Barbara Taylor BEM – For Political Service
- Simon Howard Taylor – Volunteer, Liberal Democrats. For Political and Public Service
- Advolly Xotshiwe Taylor Richmond – Plant, Garden, Social Historian and Champion, Royal Botanic Gardens, Kew. For services to Equality, Diversity and Inclusion in Horticulture
- Andrew Thorne – Chairman, Kestrel Worldwide Shipping. For services to British Exports and to British Interests in the Caribbean.
- Ian Todd – Chief Executive, Independent Parliamentary Standards Authority. For Parliamentary and Public Service
- Richard James Grenville Turfitt – Traffic Commissioner, East of England and lately Senior Traffic Commissioner. For services to Road Safety and Justice
- Clive Robert Tyldesley – Broadcaster. For services to Sports Broadcasting and to Charity
- Martin Uden – President, British Korean War Veterans Association. For services to British Veterans of the Korean War, and to UK/Korea relations.
- Helen Victoria Haines Undy – Chief Executive, Money and Mental Health Policy Institute. For Voluntary Service
- Frances Wall – Professor of Applied Mineralogy, Camborne School of Mines, University of Exeter. For services to Geoscience and Sustainable Resource Development
- Rory Wallace – Deputy Director, Steel Sector, Department for Business and Trade. For services to the Steel Industry
- Pauline Mary Walmsley – Chief Executive, Early Years – the organisation for young children. For services to Education in Northern Ireland
- Angus James Mackintosh Watson – Clinical Lead, The Scottish Capsule Programme and Clinical Chair of Surgery, University of Aberdeen. For services to Research and Surgical Care
- Graham Watson – retired Consultant Urological Surgeon; Co-founder, Medi Tech Trust. For services to the development of Endo-Urological Science and to the training of Endo-Urology Overseas.
- Gavin Webb – Officer, National Crime Agency. For services to Law Enforcement
- Victoria Ann Wells – Lately Director of Sport, Youth Sport Trust, Loughborough, Leicestershire. For services to Special Educational Needs and Disabilities
- Jonathan Mark White – Lately Chair, The Rivers Trust. For services to River Conservation
- Gill Whitehead – Chair, Women's Rugby World Cup 2025. For services to Women's Rugby
- Rachel Emma Wilkes – Chief Executive Officer, Humber Education Trust. For services to Education
- Owen Huw Williams – Team Leader, Foreign, Commonwealth and Development Office. For services to British Foreign Policy
- Mark Owen Williams – For services to Prosthetics
- Sarah Louise Williams-Gardener – Chair, FinTech Wales and lately Chair, the Western Gateway Partnership. For services to the Development of the UK Financial Services Ecosystem, Regional Economic Growth and to Charity
- Georgina Wilson – Chief Executive Officer, BUD Leaders. For services to Social Enterprise
- Thomas Woodlock – Team Leader, Ministry of Defence. For services to Defence
- Paul Workman FRS FMedSci – Lately Chief Executive and President, Institute of Cancer Research. For services to Cancer Research
- Edward James Wray – Chair, Coach Core Foundation. For services to Charity and Mental Health
- Keith Anthony John Yates – Destination Manager, Hull City Council. For services to Tourism

==== Member of the Order of the British Empire (MBE) ====
Military

- Captain Richard Vernon Angove, Royal Marines
- Chief Petty Officer (Diver) Philip Brierley
- Lieutenant Commander Rachel Sarah Campbell
- Chief Petty Officer (Photographer) Angela Cheal
- Lieutenant Commander George Richard Lunn
- Sub Lieutenant Ashta McMillan
- Lieutenant Commander Caroline Frances Oakes
- Lieutenant Ryan Sookoo
- Lieutenant Commander (Sea Cadet Corps) Fay Isadora Eleanor Taylor
- Warrant Officer 1 Engineering Technician (Marine Engineer) Mark Thomas
- Major Martin James Bentley, Corps of Royal Electrical and Mechanical Engineers
- Lieutenant Colonel Christopher William Billips, Royal Regiment of Artillery
- Warrant Officer Class 1 Casey Alan Brooks, Small Arms School Corps
- Major Steven John Russell Burton, The Rifles
- Lieutenant Colonel Mark Connelley, Intelligence Corps
- Major Jack Coolicott, Corps of Royal Electrical and Mechanical Engineers
- Warrant Officer Class 1 Adam Lee Culliford, Corps of Royal Electrical and Mechanical Engineers
- Lieutenant Paul Clifford Deakin, Army Cadet Force
- Warrant Officer Class 2 Stella Gale, Royal Army Medical Service
- Major Johnathan Green, Royal Tank Regiment
- Corporal Shane Alan John Green, Adjutant General’s Corps (Royal Military Police)
- Captain Emma Grimshore VR, Royal Army Medical Service, Army Reserve
- Corporal Dayle Mark Hardaker, Adjutant General’s Corps (Royal Military Police)
- Major Thomas Henry Raikes Hargreaves, Grenadier Guards
- Captain Stuart Thomas Hawkins, Royal Army Physical Training Corps
- Major William Patrick Heather-Hayes, The Parachute Regiment
- Major Amanda Claire Hewitt, Royal Army Veterinary Corps
- Lieutenant Colonel David Leslie Hobbs, Combined Cadet Force
- Warrant Officer Class 1 Derek Neil Hodgson, Royal Corps of Army Music
- Corporal Jessica Maites Hoggarth, The Royal Logistic Corps
- Lance Corporal of Horse Lewis Homewood, The Life Guards
- Major James Robert Hood, The Royal Lancers (Queen Elizabeths’ Own)
- Colour Sergeant Scott William Jamieson, The Royal Irish Regiment, Army Reserve
- Major Chakra Bahadur Kharti, The Queen’s Own Gurkha Logistic Regiment
- Major Mark Richard Samuel Lambert, The King’s Royal Hussars
- Major Jonathan David Leigh, Royal Corps of Signals
- Major Anthony Peter Campbell Leighton, Army Air Corps, Army Reserve
- Major Christopher Robert Mawson, Royal Army Medical Service
- Major Matthew Adrian McGarvey-Miles, The Royal Logistic Corps
- Major Maxim Stuart Erskine-Naylor, The Royal Scots Dragoon Guards
- Colonel Edwin Peter Oldfield
- Captain David Alan Paylor, The Royal Yorkshire Regiment, Army Reserve
- Colonel Sarah Raitt
- Warrant Officer Class 2 Steven Paul Sharp, Corps of Royal Engineers
- Major Aaron Mark Thompson, The Royal Logistic Corps
- Warrant Officer Class 2 Ashley Tipping, Intelligence Corps
- Lieutenant Colonel Darren Ward, Corps of Royal Electrical and Mechanical Engineers
- Staff Sergeant James Nathan Weller, Royal Army Medical Service
- Lieutenant Colonel Andrew Christopher Williams, Army Air Corps
- Lieutenant Colonel Natasha Marketa Chatham-Zvelebil, Royal Army Medical Service
- Flight Lieutenant Jack James Bentley
- Wing Commander Christopher Wyndham Berryman
- Squadron Leader Christopher Bowen
- Squadron Leader Robert Geoffrey Causer
- Squadron Leader Mark Robert Dennett
- Wing Commander Laura Kate Frowen
- Corporal David Jameson
- Flight Lieutenant Richard Geoffrey Micklethwaite
- Sergeant Gareth Anthony Roberts
- Squadron Leader Carl John Strachan
- Warrant Officer Mark Willis

Civil

- Shamsul Abdin – Head, H&K Cycle Club. For services to Charitable Fundraising
- Kresanna Margarette Aigner – Founder, Findhorn Bay Arts. For services to Arts and Culture
- Nazee Akbari – Chief Executive Officer, New Citizens' Gateway. For services to Refugees and Asylum Seekers
- Frances Innocent Collins Akor – Non-Executive Director, UK Anti-Doping. For services to Sport
- Olusola Oluronke Anike Alabi – Director, Exam Success Education Centre. For services to Education
- Hilary Alba – Specialist Midwife, Blossom Team, NHS Greater Glasgow and Clyde. For services to Community Midwifery
- Michael Peter Alcorn – Professor of Music and Associate Pro-Vice-Chancellor for Sustainability and Strategic Projects, Queen's University Belfast. For services to Music, to Higher Education and to the Creative Industries
- Harith Sadiq Ali – Fundraiser. For Charitable Service
- Kambiz Ramzan Ali – For services to the Sport of Taekwondo and the community in Harrogate, North Yorkshire
- Monwara Ali – Chief Executive Officer, Waltham Forest Community Hub. For services to the community in Waltham Forest
- Safaraz Ali – Chief Executive Officer, Pathway Group. For services to Diversity and Inclusion in Business
- Francesca Elisabeth Allen – For services to Disability Sport and to Improving Access to Sport for Young People
- Paula Allerton – Head of Apprenticeships, HM Revenue and Customs. For services to Apprenticeships
- Timothy Roy Allison – Director of Public Health, NHS Highland. For services to the NHS in Scotland
- Dominique Fara Allwood – Lately Chief Medical Officer, UCLPartners and Director of Population Health, Imperial College Healthcare NHS Trust. For services to the NHS
- Michael Kevin Almond QVRM VR DL – Professor, Veterans and Families Studies, Anglia Ruskin University and Chair, Essex Reserve Forces and Cadets Association. For services to Service Personnel and Veterans
- Aimee Louise Anderson – Project Leader, Ministry of Defence. For services to Defence
- Louise Ansari – Lately Chief Executive Officer, Healthwatch England. For services to Health Equity
- Joe Appiah – For services to Sport, to Public Health and Public Service
- Lorna Lee Armitage – Co-Founder, Capslock. For services to Cyber Security
- Brian Anthony Ashby – President, Derbyshire Community Foundation and Principal Founder, Ashby Charitable Trust and Derbyshire Patron, Marie Curie. For services to Charity and to the community in Derbyshire
- Nelson Philip Ashmole – Co-Founder, Borders Forest Trust, Scottish Borders and Volunteer Conservationist. For services to Nature
- Sarah Ann Ashton-May – Lately Director for Professional Policy and Practice, Royal College of Midwives. For services to Midwifery
- Rachel Askew-Sammut – Head of Corporate Governance and Strategy, Department for Business and Trade. For services to Economic Participation and Equality of Opportunity
- David John Astill – Managing Director, Nottingham City Transport. For services to Public Transport
- Oluremi Morenike Atoyebi – Headteacher, Osmani Primary School, London Borough of Tower Hamlets. For services to Education
- Richard Stewart Austin – Fundraiser. For services to Charitable Fundraising and Rugby
- Solange Azagury-Partridge – Jewellery Designer. For services to Design
- Mark Robert Bailey – Musician, Comedian, Actor and Broadcaster. For services to Entertainment
- Martin John Baker – Chief Commercial Affairs Officer and Managing Director, Paralympics, Channel 4. For services to Broadcasting
- Matthew Peter John Baker – For services to Technology and to Wireless Communications
- Liz Ballard – Lately Chief Executive Officer, Sheffield and Rotherham Wildlife Trust. For services to the Environment
- Andrew Jonathan Barnes – Lately Chair of Governors, City College Norwich. For services to Further Education
- Catherine Anne Barnett – Lately Head Teacher, Eveswell and Somerton Primary Schools Partnership, Newport. For services to Education
- David Llewellyn Barrington – For services to Mountain Rescue in Cumbria and the Lake District
- Isabelle Grace Barron – Team Member, WorldSkills. For services to Vocational Education
- Peter Campbell Barrow – Co-Founder, The Autumn Festival of Norfolk. For Charitable Service to the community in Norfolk
- Daniel Bates – Executive Director, Bradford Culture Company. For services to Culture in Bradford
- Leisa Batkin – For services to People Living with Diamond Blackfan Anaemia Syndrome
- Caroline Jane Bayliss – For services to the community in Harrogate and North Yorkshire
- Annette Elizabeth Beaney – For Charitable Service
- Laurence Richard Beard – Lately Chief Executive, Jericho. For services to Social Enterprise and to the community in Birmingham
- Paula Bee – Chief Executive, Age UK Wakefield District and Chair, Age England Association. For services to Older People
- Marc Yocksan Bell – Edinburgh Operational Missing Person Co-Ordinator, Edinburgh Policing Division. For services to Young People and Missing Persons
- Kathryn Jane Bennet – Chair, Gareloch Riding for the Disabled Association. For services to the Disabled Community in West and Central Scotland
- Jason Richard Bennett – All Wales Heads of Adults' Services Group, Vale of Glamorgan Council, Association of Directors of Social Services Cymru. For services to Social Care
- Mary Patricia Bennett – Chief Executive Officer, Mersey Care NHS Foundation Trust. For services to the NHS
- Fatima Benzbir – Regional Manager Airports and Festival and Events, National Express. For services to the State Funeral of Her Majesty Queen Elizabeth II
- Maureen Berry – Business Analyst, HM Revenue and Customs. For services to Inclusion
- Rishi Bhuchar – Philanthropist. For services to Philanthropy
- Jadavji Karsan Bhudia – Systems Commissioning Manager, Tideway. For services to Improving Water Quality
- Helen Victoria Bingham – Early Years Practitioner, Aspire Academy Trust, St Austell, Cornwall. For services to Early Years Education
- Valerie Ann Birchall – Assistant Director for Culture, Tourism, and Sport, Hammersmith and Fulham Council. For services to Public Libraries and to Culture
- Raja Biswas – Consultant Physician in Care of the Elderly, Cwm Taf Morgannwg University Health Board. For services to the NHS in Wales
- Karen Louise Blake – Lately Chief Executive Officer, Tech Talent Charter. For services to Technology and to Diversity
- Fiona Bloor – Technical Lead, Geographical Aspects of Law of the Sea, UK Hydrographic Office. For services to the Law of the Sea
- Paul Blundell – Team Leader, Ministry of Defence. For services to Defence
- Peter Charles Phillimore Boardman – Effects Analyst, Ministry of Defence. For services to Defence
- Gillian Dawn Boast – Training Programme Lead, General Practice Nursing Foundation School and General Practice Nursing Facilitator, Staffordshire Training Hub and Primary Care Development Nurse, Staffordshire and Stoke-on-Trent Integrated Care Board. For services to Primary Care Nursing
- Mary Patricia Bochenski – For services to People with Disabilities
- Rebecca Jane Bollands – Head Teacher, Earlson Primary School, Coventry. For services to Cultural Education in the West Midlands
- Alan Richard Borthwick – Head of Medieval and Private Records, National Records of Scotland. For services to Historical Document Recovery
- Susan Helen Bowers – Director, The Pilgrim Trust. For services to Heritage
- Keith Henry George Bowley – Volunteer, Bridgnorth Community Trust. For services to the community in Bridgnorth
- Alan Keith Boyd FMedSci – President and Chief Executive Officer, Boyd Consultants. For services to Gene Therapy and to Medical Education
- Peter Robert Boyd-Smith – Maritime Historian. For services to British Maritime History and to the community in Southampton
- Peter Eric Brewin – Director and Co-Founder Concrete Canvas Ltd. For services to Engineering Materials Innovation
- Susan Clare Briegal – Lately Chief Executive Officer, World Netball and Chair, North West Rowing Council. For services to Sport
- Joseph James Brogan – Lately Head of Pharmacy and Medicines Management, Strategic Planning and Performance Group. For services to Pharmacy and to Voluntary Service
- David Denholm Brookes – Universal Credit Programme Manager, HM Revenue and Customs. For services to Welfare Reform
- David John Brown – Volunteer and lately Archivist, National Records of Scotland. For services to Historical Document Recovery
- Simon James Brown – Volunteer, Connor Brown Trust. For services to the community in Sunderland
- Tanya Brown – Chief Executive, Connor Brown Trust. For services to the community in Sunderland
- Claire Bruce – Lately Chair of VisitAberdeenshire. For services to Tourism in the North East of Scotland
- Brian John Buchan DL – Lately Chair of the Finance Committee, The Story Museum and Chair, OXSRAD. For services to Charity and to the community in Oxfordshire
- James Buchan – Chief Executive Officer, Scottish Seafood Association. For services to the Scottish Seafood Industry
- Janice Ann Bunting – Chief Executive, Victim Support Northern Ireland. For services to Victims and Witnesses of Crime
- Anthony Michael Kennard Butler – Co-Founder, Le Cure. For services to Fundraising and Cancer Research
- Neil Anthony Byrne – Police Staff, Police National Database, North Wales Police. For services to Policing
- Dean Royston Caldwell – For Voluntary and Charitable Service to the community in South Wales
- Stuart Carpenter – Officer, National Crime Agency. For services to Law Enforcement
- Mervin Cato – Head of Secondary Behaviour Support Service, Enfield Council. For services to Education
- Nicholas Michael Cawthra – Policy Adviser, Ministry of Defence. For services to Defence
- Hassan Chaabane – Team Leader, Ministry of Defence. For services to Defence
- Judith Lesley Charlesworth – Lately Chair, Barnet Special Education Trust, London. For services to Education
- Jane Charlton-Jones – For services to the community in Northamptonshire
- Divine Charura – Professor of Counselling Psychology, York St John University. For services to Inclusion and to the Advancement of Counselling and Psychotherapy in Research and Practice
- Eileen Gillian Clark – Vice-Chair, Pickwick Academy Trust Board and Chair, School Improvement Committee. For services to Education
- Thomas Michael Clarke-Forrest – Founder and Chief Executive Officer, Sport 4 Life UK. For services to Young People
- Sarah Elizabeth Clayton-Fisher – Head of Region, Africa and Overseas Branches, British Red Cross. For services to the Red Cross
- Richard William Clothier – Managing Director, Wyke Farms. For services to Sustainable Agriculture and Food Production
- Tea Colaianni – Founder and Chair, WiHTL and Diversity in Retail. For services to Inclusion in the Hospitality, Travel, Leisure and Retail Sectors
- Lucy Conley – Lately Chief Executive Officer, South Lincolnshire Academies Trust. For services to Education
- David Cook – Foster Carer, St Helens Borough Council, St Helens, Merseyside. For services to Foster Care
- Susan Cook – Foster Carer, St Helens Borough Council, St Helens, Merseyside. For services to Foster Care
- Daniel Costello – Chair, Spartans Football Club. For services to Community Sport and Youth Development
- Edward Cowley – Senior Policy Adviser, NHS England. For services to the Nursing Workforce
- Michelle Cox – Nurse and Race Equality Consultant, Michelle Cox Consultancy. For services to Nursing and Patient Outcomes
- Alan Andrew Craig – Founder and Musical Director, Springfield Cambridge Festival Chorus and Orchestra. For services to Fundraising for Children's Hospices
- William Campbell Crawford – Director and Co-Founder, Concrete Canvas Ltd. For services to Engineering Materials Innovation and to Export
- Kathryn Anne Crewe-Read – Lately Headteacher, Bishop's Stortford College. For services to Education
- Andrea Joanne Cullen – Co-Founder, Capslock. For services to Cyber Security
- Christopher Cunnington-Shore JP DL – For services to Magistracy and Healthcare in County Durham
- Carolyn Margaret Currie – Chief Executive Officer, Women's Enterprise Scotland. For services to Women's Entrepreneurship, Economic Empowerment, and to Gender Equality
- Natasha Curry – Deputy Director of Policy, The Nuffield Trust. For services to Social Care Policy
- Victor Dade – Hunstanton Crew, Royal National Lifeboat Institution. For services to Maritime Safety
- Matthew Ian Daniels – For services to the LGBTQ+ Community in Birmingham and the West Midlands
- Ann Flame Davey – Head of Insider Threat and Airport Security Screening Policy, Department for Transport. For services to Aviation Security
- Edison David – Executive Headteacher, Granton Primary School, London Borough of Lambeth. For services to Education
- Neil Marshall Davidson DL – Charitable Fundraiser. For services to Charity and the community in Calderdale, West Yorkshire
- Dean Mark Davies – Team Leader, Ministry of Defence. For services to Defence
- Eleri Lloyd Davies – Consultant in Oncoplastic Surgery, Cardiff and Vale University Health Board. For services to Breast Care
- Kerry Davis – For services to Association Football and to Diversity in Sport
- Sarah Louise Day – Business Delivery Unit Lead, Association of Directors of Social Services Cymru. For services to Social Care
- James William Deane – Founder, Sporting Family Change. For services to Sport and Fitness in Bath and North East Somerset
- Marianne De beristain humphrey (marianne butler) – Co-Founder, Le Cure. For services to Fundraising and Cancer Research
- Robert David Deeks – Chief Executive Officer, Together As One. For services to Young People and to the community in Slough
- Christopher Deering – For services to People with Disabilities in the London Borough of Bexley
- Janet Beverly Dell – Lifeguard. For services to Lifeguarding
- Jacqueline Anne Dellar – Lately Chief Executive Officer, Oxford Diocesan Schools Trust. For services to Education
- Judith Frances Dewinter BEM – Chair, Royal Free Charity. For services to the NHS
- Eric Alain Dilworth – Programme Manager, Made Smarter Adoption Programme, The Growth Company. For services to Business Growth and Digitalisation
- Ishtiaq Ahmed Din – Playwright and Screenwriter. For services to the Arts and Young People in the North East
- Tracey Annette Dix-Williams – Lately Chief Executive Officer, Dudley Canal and Tunnel Trust. For services to Heritage
- Laura Jane Drysdale – Founder, The Restoration Trust. For services to Heritage and Mental Health
- Gael Campbell Drummond – Chief Executive Officer, Firstport. For services to Social Enterprise
- Donnalee Duffus clayton – Head of Resourcing and People, Government Office for Science. For Public Service
- Nichola Claire Dugmore – Unit Welfare Officer, Defence Serious Crime Command. For services to Service Police Personnel
- David Hastings Dunn – Chair, West Midlands Military Education Committee. For services to Military Education and to Recruitment
- Jacquelyn Bridget Dunne – Vice-Chancellor, Birmingham Newman University. For services to Higher Education
- Peter Gerard Dunphy – Common Councillor, City of London Corporation. For services to Amenity Conservation and to Volunteering
- Reginald Kenneth East – Foster Carer, Hertfordshire Council, Hertfordshire. For services to Foster Care
- Ava Maria Easton – Chief Executive, Encephalitis International. For services to People Affected by Encephalitis
- Elaine Edwards – Founder and Chair, Families and Babies. For services to Breastfeeding Mothers
- Paul Harman Elliott – Ambassador, Marie Curie. For Charitable Service
- Sarah Ellis – Director of Creative Innovation, Royal Shakespeare Company. For services to Technology in the Arts
- Roland Christian Douglas Schau Engebretsen – Co-Founder and Director, MacAulay College, Isle of Lewis. For services to Education, to Social Inclusion and to People with Additional Support Needs in the Western Isles
- Andrea English – Lately Executive Headteacher, North and South West Durham Learning Federation. For services to Education
- Cynthia Erivo – Actor, Singer, Producer and Author. For services to Music and Drama
- Julie Erskine – Chair, Business Services Organisation. For services to Health and Social Care
- Timothy James Lloyd Evans – Chief Executive, Welsh Fishermans Association. For services to Fishing
- Samantha Everard – Founder and Chief Executive Officer, Support and Mentoring Enabling Entrepreneurship and Chair, South West Regional Stakeholder Network. For services to People with Disabilities
- Marcus Fair – Founder, Eternal Media. For services to Addiction Recovery, to Ex-Offenders and to Tackling Homelessness
- Jennifer Mitchell Fairgrieve – Chair, Libertus Elderly Services. For services to Older People
- Anne Elizabeth Fairhurst – Executive Lead Member for Adult Social Care and Public Health, Hampshire County Council. For services to Adult Social Care
- Anthony Fallshaw – Lately Cameraman and Editor, BBC News. For services to Journalism
- Peter Farrell – Construction Management Professor Emeritus, University of Greater Manchester. For services to Higher Education and to the Construction Industry
- Brian Angus Ferguson – Public Health Strategic Advisor, National Institute for Health and Care Research, Department of Health and Social Care. For services to Public Health Research
- Louise Helen Fetigan – Founder, Little Troopers. For services to Young People
- Charles Findlay – Member, Whitehills and District Community Council. For services to the community in Banffshire
- Jocelyn Daphne Finnigan – For services to Heritage and to Charity in Herefordshire
- Janet Ann Nichole Fischer – Chief Executive Officer, Live Music Now and Co-Chair, Intra Community Trust. For services to Music and to Charity
- Andrew Fishburn – Managing Director, Virgin StartUp. For services to Small Businesses and Entrepreneurship
- Margaret Antoinette Fisher – Lately Chair of Governors, Dorridge Primary School. For services to Education
- Simone Louise Fisher – Director of Equality, Diversity and Inclusion, Professional Footballers Association. For services to Association Football
- Peter Fitzpatrick – Station Manager, Greater Manchester Fire and Rescue Service. For services to Burn Victims
- John Patrick Flatley – Programme Director, Crime Statistics Production and Analysis, Home Office. For Public Service
- Vanessa Claire Ford – Chief Executive, South West London and St George's Mental Health NHS Trust. For services to Mental Health Nursing
- Carolyn Phyllis Forster – For services to the community in Northern Ireland
- Alan Edward Foster – Governor, Wilberforce Sixth Form College, Yorkshire. For services to Further Education
- Marion Lindsay Foster – Master Kilt Tailor and Founder, The College of Master Kilt Tailors. For services to Scottish Craftsmanship
- Veronica Ruth Franklin gould – Founder, Arts 4 Dementia. For Charitable Service
- Michael Charles French – Head of Games, Film London and Festival Director, London Games Festival. For services to the Games Industry, to Inclusion and to Charity
- Simon David Anthony Friend – For services to Charity
- John Edward Fry – For services to Roller Speed Skating and to the community in Birmingham
- Herbert Fryer – Officer, National Crime Agency. For services to Law Enforcement
- Claire Gallery-Strong – Corporate Services Director, Nuclear Waste Services. For services to the Nuclear Industry
- Lorenzo Garagnani – Consultant Orthopaedic Hand and Wrist Surgeon, Guy's and St Thomas' NHS Foundation Trust. For services to Children with Hand and Upper Limb Differences
- Major (Rtd) John Douglas Gaye – For services to the community in Dorset
- Fiona Mary George – Trustee, Rumbletums Community Cafe, Kimberley, Nottinghamshire. For services to Special Educational Needs
- Kathryn Mary Geraghty – Head of Technical Qualifications, National Theatre, London. For services to Education and Skills
- Martin John Gerrard QPM DL – For services to the community in Surrey
- Philip Peter Gerrard – Chief Executive Officer Deaf Action. For services to the Deaf Community, to Cultural Inclusion and to Disability Rights
- Lisa Nichole Gerson DL JP – For services to Optometry, Education and Social Cohesion
- Alexander Gibson BEM – Founder and Chair, Challenging Motor Neurone Disease. For Charitable Service
- Beth Gibson – Head of Attendance and Inclusive Pathways, Birmingham City Council, West Midlands. For services to Education
- Kenneth Samuel Gibson – Lately Director of Student and Learning Services, Stranmillis University College. For services to Education
- Alison Gilchrist – Enforcement Officer, Trading Standards Service, Department for the Economy, Northern Ireland Civil Service. For Public Service
- Jonathan Patric Gilchrist – Joint President, UK Theatre. For services to Theatre
- Jacqueline Gittins – For services to Gender Equality in the Workplace
- Susan Anne Goodchild – Councillor, Central Bedfordshire Council. For services to Local Government and the community in Bedfordshire
- Christopher Goodwill – Facilities Manager, House of Lords. For services to Parliament
- Phillip Gould-Bourn – For services to the community in Cheadle, Greater Manchester
- Elena Jane Goulding – Lately UN Goodwill Ambassador, UN Environmental Programme and Ambassador, World Wildlife Fund. For services to Biodiversity and the Climate
- Andrew William Graham – Managing Director, White Willow Consulting. For services to Transport Safety and Efficiency
- Evelyn May Graham – Recording Artist. For services to the Music Industry
- Alex Greenwood – Athlete, England Senior Women's Football Team. For services to Association Football.
- Suzanne Celia Griffiths – Director, National Adoption Service and Foster Wales. For services to Children's Social Care
- Clive Leslie Gritten BEM JP – For services to Children, Young People and the community in Norfolk
- Isa Tara Guha – Founder and Chair, Take Her Lead. For services to Inclusivity and Cricket
- Shanaz Begum Gulzar – Creative Director, Bradford Culture Company. For services to Culture in Bradford
- Frances Elisabeth Gunn DL – Chair, Flow Country World Heritage Site Steering Group. For services to Heritage and the community in Sutherland
- David John Gurney – Chief Executive Officer, Cockburn Multi-Academy Trust, Leeds, Yorkshire. For services to Education
- David Thomas Gurney – Lately Film Laboratory Lead, British Film Institute. For services to Cinema and Heritage
- Jane Louise Hadfield – Lately Board Member, Institute for Apprenticeships and Technical Education, Bristol. For services to Education
- Iain Andrew Haggis – Lately Senior Scientist, Ministry of Defence. For services to Defence
- Elizabeth Rose Hamilton – Security Guard, Stormont Castle. For Public Service
- Jacqueline Hanson – Lately Regional Chief Nurse, NHS England. For services to the Nursing Profession and Health Service Leadership
- Mary Harland – Councillor, Leeds City Council. For Political Service
- Brian James Harris – For services to Arts Institutions and the Voluntary Sector
- Martin Francis Harvey – Patient Advisor Work Coach, Department for Work and Pensions. For Public Service
- Stephen Charles Hedley – Chief Executive, Trinity Homeless Projects. For services to Ending Homelessness
- Paul Kevin Hegarty – Trustee, Licensed Trade Charity. For Charitable Service to the Hospitality Sector
- Aileen Henderson – Hand Embroidery Supervisor, Wyedean Weaving Ltd. For services to Defence Ceremonial
- Moyra Helen Hendry – Primary Advisor, Moray Council Education Department and formerly, Head Teacher at Cullen Primary School, Moray. For services to Education
- Paul Hennessy – Team Leader, Ministry of Defence. For services to Defence
- Michael Robert Quixano Henriques – Chair, The County Air Ambulance Helicopter Emergency Landing Pads Appeal. For Charitable Service
- Patricia Elizabeth Hewitt – Lately National Clinical Claims Manager, NHS Blood and Transplant. For services to Medicine
- David Jeremy Higlett – Lately Universal Credit Policy Lead, Department for Work and Pensions. For services to Welfare Reform.
- Paul Joseph Higson – Project Manager and Volunteer. For services to the Built Heritage of Scotland
- Richard William Hilling – For services to Victims of Trauma and Gulf War Syndrome
- Emma Jane Hinde (Emma D'Souza) – Executive Director, Audiences and Commercial, Society of London Theatre. For services to Theatre
- David John Hindle – For services to the community in Grimsargh, Lancashire
- Roger Charles Hirst – Police, Fire and Crime Commissioner, Essex. For services to Policing and to Community Safety
- Martin Robert Hodgson – Chief Executive Officer, YMCA Dulverton Group. For services to the community in Somerset
- Valmai Diana Holt – For services to Military History and War Commemoration
- Emeritus Anna Mary Horwood – Emeritus Professor of Orthoptics and Visual Development, University of Reading and Senior Orthoptist, Royal Berkshire NHS Foundation Trust. For services to Orthoptics and to Research in Visual Development
- Nicholas John Kenneth Howden – Honorary Vice President, Chartered Institution of Water and Environmental Management. For services to Water Management and to Education
- David William Hudson – Lately Headteacher, Royal Latin School, Buckinghamshire. For services to Education
- Joanna Clare Hughes – Director, Joanna Hughes Solicitor Apprenticeships. For services to Education and Skills
- Ayla Frances Humphrey – Associate Professor, Department of Psychiatry, University of Cambridge. For services to Young People with Acquired Brain Injuries
- Lynne Jeannette Hunt – Lately Chair, Hampshire and Isle of Wight Healthcare NHS Foundation Trust. For services to the NHS
- Peter David Hunt – For Parliamentary and Political Services
- Sandra Igwe – Chief Executive Officer, The Motherhood Group. For services to Social Enterprise
- James Francis Irvine – Lately Chair, DEBRA. For services to People Living with Epidermolysis Bullosa
- Hazrat Islam – Senior Manager, Regions and Providers Directorate, Department for Education. For services to Further Education
- Ruth Ive – Foster Carer, Fostering North Yorkshire, North Yorkshire Council. For services to Foster Care
- Michael Arthur Pardoe James – Chief Executive, Cardiff and Vale College. For services to Education and to Future Skills
- Helayna Carole Jenkins – Principal Loneliness Champion, London Borough of Bromley. For services to Tackling Loneliness
- Robert Wilfred Jenkins – For services to the community in the Forest of Dean
- Paula Jennings – For services to Adults with Learning Difficulties in Northern Ireland
- Alistair Jinks – Director, Business Services, Northern Ireland Water. For services to the Environment and to the Economy
- William Charles Johnston – Executive Director, Railway Mission. For services to the Rail Workforce.
- Anthony Joseph Jones – Volunteer, Royal National Lifeboat Institution and Chair, New Brighton Community Centre. For Voluntary Service to Maritime Safety and to the community in New Brighton
- Christopher Cynlais Jones – Volunteer Senior Rugby Development Officer, Rhondda Schools Rugby. For services to the community in Rhondda
- Clive Jones – Volunteer, Market Drayton. For services to Blind Veterans UK
- Eileen Jones – For services to Animal Welfare and to the community in Rhondda Valley
- Julia Patricia Gordon Jones – Professor in Conservation Science, School of Environmental and Natural Sciences. For services to the Environment
- Matthew Trevor Jones – Founder and Chief Executive Officer, R4 Advertising. For services to Entrepreneurship and to Advertising
- Megan Elizabeth Jones – For services to Rugby Union Football
- Nigel David Jones – Emergency Medical Technician, Welsh Ambulance Service University NHS Trust. For Voluntary Service
- Tara Louise Jones – Rugby League Referee. For services to Rugby League Football
- Sadia Kabeya – For services to Rugby Union Football
- Julie Jean Kapsalis – Lately Chair, Coast to Capital Local Enterprise Partnership. For services to Economic Development
- Maeve Geraldine Louise Keaney – Founder, The Refugee and Asylum Seekers Centre for Healthcare Professionals Education, North West. For services to Refugee Doctors in Greater Manchester
- Rebecca Keer – Community Engagement and Partnership Manager, Rahab. For services to the Prevention of Violence Against Women and Girls
- Stephen John Kelly – Joint Director of Planning and Economic Development, Greater Cambridge Shared Planning Service. For services to Town Planning
- Raymond Michael James Kendall – Ward Manager, South Eastern Health and Social Care Trust. For services to Nursing and Healthcare for Older People
- Denis Stowell Kenyon – For services to War Commemoration and the community in Hallaton, Leicestershire
- James Bouromsak Keothavong – For services to Tennis and Tennis Umpiring
- Patrick Brian Kerr – Co-Founder, Le Cure. For services to Fundraising and Cancer Research
- Rokia Khair – For services to Heritage and to Charity in Derbyshire
- Steven Kidd – Head of Operational Engagement, Home Office. For services to Law Enforcement
- Ellie Kildunne – For services to Rugby Union Football
- Colonel (Rtd) Anthony Thomas Brice Kimber – For services to the community in Rye and East Sussex
- Amanda King – Early Years Strategic Lead, Warwickshire County Council and Coventry City Council. For services to Early Years Education
- Louise Maria Kingsley – Director of Performance, Great Britain Rowing Team. For services to Sport
- Alexandra Knight – Founder and Chief Executive Officer, STEMAZING. For services to Diversity and Inclusion in Engineering
- Anne Therese Knox – Deputy Chief Executive, Stirlingshire Voluntary Enterprise. For services to Good Governance of Small Charities
- Maninder Kohli – For services to Fashion
- Deepa Korea – Director, Royal College of Nursing Foundation. For services to Nursing and Midwifery
- Nasser Kurdy – For services to Community Interfaith Reconciliation
- Catherine Lackie – Lately Receptionist and Clerical Assistant, Royal Hospital for Children and Young People. For services to the NHS in Scotland
- David Smart Laing – Lately Chair, Borders Disability Sports Group. For services to Sport
- Susan Lane – Head of Business Management, Programmes and Directors Private Offices, HM Revenue and Customs. For Charitable, Voluntary and Public Service
- Vanessa Marie Langley – Headteacher, Arbourthorne Community Primary School, Sheffield, South Yorkshire. For services to Education
- Captain (Rtd) David John Larcombe – Branch Chair and National Association Trustee, the Royal Tank Regiment Association. For Voluntary Service to Veterans
- Josephine Lavelle – Director, Marketing and Engagement, Forestry England. For services to Forestry
- Funmi Aishah Lawal – Founder and Chief Executive Officer, Clip-Knix. For services to Disability, Entrepreneurship and to Volunteering
- Kenneth Hamilton Lawton – Disability Services Advocacy Manager, Department for Work and Pensions. For services to Vulnerable Families and to the Veteran Community
- The Reverend Prebendary Doctor Brian Leathard – Lately Rector, St Lukes and Christ Church, Chelsea. For services to the community in the Royal Borough of Kensington and Chelsea
- Julia Margaret Lee – Lately Referee and Advocate for Women's Rugby League Football. For services to Rugby League Football
- Neil Lloyd Lewis – Co-Founder, Tiny Toes Nursery, Southampton, Hampshire. For services to Early Years Education
- Sasha Nicole Lewis – Co-Founder, Tiny Toes Nursery, Southampton, Hampshire. For services to Early Years Education
- Steven David Lewis – For services to Jewish Care and the community in Greater London
- Joanne Liddle – Managing Director, Industrial Precision Components Ltd. For services to the Aerospace Sector in Northern Ireland
- Noel Liggett – For services to the community in South Belfast
- Rebecca Anne Lindsay – Co-Founder and Director, MacAulay College, Isle of Lewis. For services to Education, to Social Inclusion, and to People with Additional Support Needs in the Western Isles
- Sally Jane Lindsay – Actor. For services to Drama
- Jonathan Piers Daniel Linney – Executive Chair, Implement AI Limited. For services to Small Business, to Entrepreneurs, to Investors, to Banking and to Diversity and Social Mobility
- Valerie Tarere Lolomari – Founder, Women of Grace UK. For services to the Prevention of Violence Against Women and Girls
- Michael Andrew Loncaster – Lately Headteacher, Molescroft Primary School, Beverley, East Riding of Yorkshire. For services to Education
- Philip Derek Lumb – Forensic Pathologist, High Peak Forensics. For services to Forensic Pathology and the Criminal Justice System
- James Philip Lupton – Employment Tax Specialist, Lloyds Banking Group and Chair, HM Revenue and Customs Taxpayers' Data Standards Forum. For services to Taxpayers
- Nigel Lymn rose – Chair, A.W. Lymn The Family Funeral Service and formerly President, National Association of Funeral Directors. For services to the Bereaved
- Ian Angus Mackenzie – Chair, Harris Tweed Hebrides. For services to the Harris Tweed Industry
- Michael Frank Mail – Founder and Chief Executive, Foundation for Jewish Heritage. For services to Heritage and to Charity
- Margaret Edna Maltby – County President, Girlguiding Somerset. For services to Young People
- Gavin Thomas Mann – Data Lead for Retirement Services, Department for Work and Pensions. For Public Service
- Lynne Frances Vickers Mansfield – For services to Girlguiding
- Helen Elise Mark DL – For services to Broadcasting
- Jeffrey Philip Marsh – Chief Executive Officer, The Foxton Centre. For services to the community in Preston
- Michael John Marsh – Lately South West Regional Medical Director, NHS England. For services to the NHS
- Philip John Marsh – Head of Openings, OnSide. For services to Young People
- Richard Antony Marshall – Founder and Chief Executive Officer, Pall Mall Barbers. For services to International Trade, Mentoring and to People with Dyslexia
- Michael Henry Marx – Trustee Holocaust Memorial Day Trust. For services to Holocaust Remembrance and Education.
- Sarah Helen Massey – Managing Director, Women's Rugby World Cup 2025. For services to Women's Rugby Union
- Professor Avtar Singh Matharu – Professor of Chemistry, University of York. For services to Equality, Diversity and Inclusion and to Interfaith and Community Cohesion
- Andrew Lynn Mathias – Head of Communications for Economy and Infrastructure, Welsh Government. For services to LGBTQ+ community in Wales
- Paul Laurence May – For services to Charitable Fundraising and to Neurosurgery
- Edward Mayo – Lately Chief Executive Officer, Pilotlight. For Charitable Service
- Catherine Mbema – Director of Public Health, London Borough of Lewisham. For services to Public Health
- Lucy Elizabeth Millicent McCarraher – Founder, Business Book Awards. For services to Publishing and to Diversity
- Rhys Joshua McClenaghan BEM – For services to Gymnastics
- James Wallace McConachie – Owner, Westbank Group Ltd. For services to the Electrical Control Industry in Northern Ireland
- Vivienne Lesley McCormack – Managing Director, Michaeljohn Training Manchester, Greater Manchester. For services to Vocational Education
- Deirdre Johanna McCormick – Chief Nurse, Head of Service Public Protection, NHS Greater Glasgow and Clyde. For services to Public Protection
- Sandra McCourt – Volunteer. For services to Young Survivors of Sexual Abuse and to the Young LGBTQ+ Community
- Mark William McCulloch – For services to Marketing and to the Hospitality Industry
- Michael McDonnell – Director, Road Safety Scotland. For services to Road Safety in Scotland
- Tina Louise McFarling – Head of Strategic Communications, British Film Institute. For services to the Film Industry
- Lawrence Peter McGarry – Volunteer, The Legion of Mary Wayside Club. For services to the community in Glasgow
- William McGranaghan – Founder, DadsHouse. For services to Vulnerable Families, Food Bank Provision and to the community in Greater London
- Kim McGrath – Head of Members' HR, Members' and Members Staff Services Team, House of Commons. For services to Parliament
- Iain McInnes – Officer, National Crime Agency. For services to Law Enforcement
- Allison McKay – Chief Executive, The Forum Music Centre, Darlington, County Durham. For services to Music
- Gary McKee – Fundraiser. For services to Charity and to the community in Cleator Moor, Cumbria
- Gail McManus – Founder and Director, Private Equity Recruitment. For services to Private Equity and Venture Capital
- Andrew McMillan – Poet and Novelist. For services to Literature
- John Loy McMillan – Chief Executive, The Eric Liddell Community. For services to Community Development, to Sport and to Social Enterprise
- Marilyn Avril Courtney McMullan (Marilyn Shanks) – For services to Education in Northern Ireland
- Paul Hugh McNeill – Ambassador for Dyslexia Scotland. For services to Young People with Dyslexia
- Sandra Jean McNeish – Policy Advisor, Department of Business and Trade. For services to Consumer Protection and to Industry
- Sebastian Alexander McVicker-Orringe – Portfolio Lead, Risk and Intelligence Service, HM Revenue and Customs. For services to Tackling Offshore Tax Non-Compliance
- Barry Mead – Trustee, Cresswell Pele Tower and Director, Newbiggin Heritage Partnership. For services to Heritage
- Elizabeth Anne Meehan – Patient Demographics Service Manager, Health and Social Care. For services to Healthcare
- Ritan Ashvinkumar Mehta – Head of Medical and Team Doctor, England Senior Women's Football Team. For services to Association Football
- Ranu Mehta-Radia – Founder, Sai School of Harrow, London Borough of Harrow. For services to the community in Greater London
- Major Alisdair Miller – Volunteer. For services to the community in Sutherland
- Wilma Milligan – For services to Charity and Food Poverty
- Ronald Charles Mills – Trustee, Jack Petchey Foundation. For services to Young People in London and Essex
- Sarah Louise Mo – Operational Lead, Resettlement Operations, Home Office. For Public Service
- Deborah Monk – Founder and Chair, Forgotten Feet. For services to Podiatry for Homeless People
- Tanya Moore – Principal Social Worker, Essex County Council. For services to Social Work
- Bernard Owen Morgan – Volunteer, Imperial War Museum. For services to Volunteering and to History
- Michael Morgan – For Voluntary and Charitable Service in Wales
- Evan David Gareth Morgans – Lately Director of Education and Childrens' Services, Carmarthenshire. For services to Education and to the Dolen Cymru Lesotho Charity
- Beverley Gail Morris – Rapid Response Co-Ordinator, Department for Work and Pensions. For Public Service
- Charles David Owen Morris – For services to Cinema in the North of England
- Richard Duncan Morrison – Music Critic. For services to Music
- Patricia Moss – Team Leader, Ministry of Defence. For services to Defence
- Steven Ronald Munkley – Vice-President, Craft Guild of Chefs. For services to the Hospitality Industry and to Young People
- George Nicholas Munson – Lately Energy and Climate Change Manager, Leeds City Council. For services to Net Zero and the Heat Network Sector
- Christopher Murdock – Chair, St John Ambulance Northern Ireland. For Voluntary Service to St John Ambulance
- Henri Murison – Chief Executive, The Northern Powerhouse Partnership. For services to the Economy
- Mary Murray – Secretariat, The Music Education Partnership Group. For services to Music and Education
- Suzanne Nantcurvis – For services to Charity
- Jacqueline Margaret Neal – Managing Director, Abbey Forged Products. For services to Women in the Steel Industry
- Stella Maureen Neaves – Hampshire West County Badge Secretary, Girlguiding South West England. For services to Girlguiding
- Laurence Richard Simon Newman – For Charitable Service
- Fiona Nicolson – Lately Officer, National Crime Agency. For services to Law Enforcement
- Bhishma Raj Niraula – Hindu Religious Teacher (Pandit Ji), Royal Gurkha Rifles, Brunei. For services to British Forces Brunei
- James Clark Noble – For services to the community in Corby
- Simon Nokes – Lately Executive Director for Policy and Strategy, Greater Manchester Combined Authority. For services to Regional Economic Growth, Policy Development and Investment Strategies
- Wilbur Arthur Notley – Fundraiser, Marie Curie Cancer Care. For services to Charity and to the community in Norfolk
- Clement Chukwumerije Ogbonnaya – Chief Executive Officer, We Are The Village People. For services to Hospitality and to Business
- Kevin Andrew Craig Osbon – Founder, Focus Consultants. For services to the Economy and to Regeneration in the East Midlands
- Lewis Owens – For Charitable Service
- Franklin Owusu-Antwi – Councillor and Chair of Council, South Gloucestershire Council. For services to Local Government
- Lynn Marie Pallister – Social Enterprise Manager, Future Regeneration of Grangetown. For services to Social Enterprise
- Kevin Mark Palmer – Deputy Director Professional Learning, Pedagogy and Leadership, Welsh Government. For services to Education
- Richard Stanley Palusinski – Chair, Spirit of Normandy Trust. For Voluntary Service to Veterans
- Paul Pangalos – Officer, National Crime Agency. For services to Law Enforcement
- Vera Parnaby – Consett Poppy Appeal Coordinator, The Royal British Legion. For Voluntary Service to Veterans and the community in County Durham
- Catherine Mary Parums – Head of Remembrance Events, The Royal British Legion. For services to National Commemorative Events
- Margaret Peacock – For services to the community in Coleraine, County Londonderry
- Lorraine Peake – Director, Super Slow Way. For services to the community in Lancashire
- Simon Pearson – Founding Director, Lincoln Institute of Agri-Food Technology, University of Lincoln. For services to Agricultural Innovation and Education
- David Stephen Perks – For services to Athletics
- Kathryn Elizabeth Peters – Lately Bureau Chief Russia and Ukraine, BBC. For services to Journalism
- John Pickford – Lately News Editor In Chief, Bauer Media. For services to Broadcasting and Local News
- Emeritus Andrew Joseph George Pithouse – Lately Special Policy Adviser, Welsh Government. For services to Social Care Education and Policy
- David Nicholas Pollacchi – Volunteer Coach and Founding Trustee Board Member, Lochend Football Academy. For services to the community in Lochend
- Carl Portman – Manager, Chess in Prisons, English Chess Federation. For services to Prisoners
- Neil Reginald Poulter – Professor of Preventative Cardiovascular Medicine, Imperial College London. For services to Hypertension Prevention
- Elizabeth Emma Campbell Prescott – Specialist Nurse for Thalassaemia, Whittington Health NHS Trust. For services to People Living with Thalassaemia Syndrome
- Elizabeth Agnes Purdy – Business Support Officer, Education Authority Northern Ireland. For services to Education and to the Girls Brigade
- Kim Marcelle Quaintrell – Head of Reducing Reoffending, HM Prison Winchester, HM Prison and Probation Service. For Public Service
- Babar Ali Qureshi – Co-Founder, The Research Club and i-view London. For services to Business, to Charity and to Cricket
- Robert Paul Rams – For Political Service
- Clive David Rand – Committee Member, West Yorkshire Business Branch, Royal National Lifeboat Institution. For Voluntary Service to the Royal National Lifeboat Institution.
- George Rankin – Lately Officer, National Crime Agency. For services to Law Enforcement
- Karen Ratcliffe – Lately Headteacher, Harton Primary School, South Shields, Tyne and Wear. For services to Education
- Paul Raymond – For services to the English Shotokan Karate Association in the South East
- Jennifer Isobella Rayner – Founder and Chief Executive, The Lucy Rayner Foundation. For services to Mental Health
- Solange Marie Hélene Rebours – Financial Consultant, Girlguiding South West England. For services to Girlguiding
- Dwarampudi Rama Krishna Reddy – Director, Homeless Housing. For services to Homeless People in Preston
- Ian Michael Redfern-Jones – Group Secretary, North Wales Group of Advanced Motorists. For services to Road Safety
- Brian Kinsey Rees – For services to Farm Safety
- John Gareth Rees – Chief Scientist, Multi-Hazards and Resilience, British Geological Survey. For services to Multi-Hazard Science and Disaster Risk Reduction
- David Reid – Volunteer, REMAP. For services to People with Disabilities
- Kelvin Edward Reynolds – Chief Technical Services Officer and Company Secretary, British Parking Association. For services to Traffic and Parking Management
- Louise Richards – Co-Founder and Executive Director, Motionhouse. For services to Dance
- Alistair Brian Risk – Volunteer. For services to Charity
- Julie Louise Ritson – Film Editor and Camerawoman, BBC. For services to Journalism
- Toby Roberts – For services to Sport Climbing
- Martin John Rogers – Cub Scout Leader and Trustee for District Scout Council. For services to Young People, to Scouting and to the community in Rosyth, Fife
- Ellen Melissa Roome – Campaigner. For services to Children's Online Safety
- Karen Helen Ross – Voluntary Director and Secretary, Kilmadock Development Trust, and Chair, Doune and Deanston Youth Project. For services to the community in Doune and Deanston
- Emma Louise Rule – Founder, Musicians Against Homelessness. For Charitable Service to Homeless People and to Aspiring Musicians
- Lynsey Russell – Senior Charge Nurse, Intensive Care Unit, Borders General Hospital, NHS Borders. For services to the NHS
- Clare Sawdon JP DL – Magistrate and Chair, Coventry and Warwickshire Bench. For services to Justice
- Janet Scott – Lately East Midlands Regional Chair, Conservative Party. For Political Service
- Michael Scott – Board Member, Osprey Housing, Board Member, SCARF and Board Member, Aberdeen Heat and Power. For Public Service
- William Desmond Scott – Founder and Chair, Scott and Ewing Ltd and Woodvale Construction Ltd. For services to Construction in Northern Ireland
- Jay Bobby Seagull – Teacher, Author and Broadcaster. For services to Public Libraries
- Kulwant Singh Sehmi – Lately Departmental Head, Imaging Service, Moorfields Eye Hospital NHS Foundation Trust. For services to the NHS and to Diagnostic Ophthalmic Imaging
- Ramona Senior – Police Staff, West Yorkshire Police. For services to Policing
- Sajda Khatoon Shah – Strategy and Transformation Lead, Sajda Shah Consultancy. For services to Community Development
- Robert Harold Sharp – For Voluntary Service to Mountain Rescue in Scotland
- Mohammed Shaukat – Volunteer, Glasgow Central Mosque. For services to the community in Glasgow
- Caroline Anne Shaw – Chief Executive Officer, Imago Community. For services to Community Development in the South East
- Ruth Antonia Shilston – Global Practice Lead, Mott MacDonald. For services to Sustainable Engineering
- Sarah Rosemary Silver – Head of Safeguarding, Tiney UK. For services to Early Years Education
- Andrew Simpson – Chief Executive Officer, Doncaster Refurnish. For services to Social Enterprise
- Lianne Marie Simpson – Founder and Director, Diamond Hampers. For services to Tackling Food Waste and the community of Cambridgeshire
- Raphael Frederick Sims-Williams – Bereavement Support Volunteer, Cruse Bereavement Support. For services to the Bereaved
- Balbir Singh – Artistic Director, Balbir Singh Dance Company. For services to Dance
- Stuart Skinner – Founder, Head Outside. For services to Mental Health through Training, Outdoor Leadership and Community Engagement
- Julian Anthony Trevor Smith – Corporate Lead, Home Office. For Public Service
- Patricia Margaret Smith – Member, Fundraising Committee, Royal National Lifeboat Institution. For services to the community in Orkney
- Martin Denis Solder – Chief Executive Officer, Essex Boys and Girls Clubs. For services to Young People
- Kylie Melissa Spark – Chief Executive Officer, Inspiring Learners Multi-Academy Trust, Cheshire. For services to Education
- Timothy Denning Sparrow – Founder, South East Communities Rail Partnership. For services to Community Railways.
- Phillip John Edward Spencer – Patron, St Mungo's. For Charitable Service
- John Dudley Spiers – Chief Executive Officer, The EQ Foundation and Chair, EQ Investors. For services to Business and to Charity
- Georgina Stafford – Senior Teacher, Rumworth School, Bolton, Greater Manchester. For services to Education
- Georgia Marie Stanway – Athlete, England Senior Women's Football Team. For services to Association Football.
- Donald James Millar Starritt – Head, Road Safety Policy, Department for Infrastructure, Northern Ireland Civil Service. For services to Road Safety and to Environmental Protection
- Adele Suzanne Steel – For services to Girlguiding
- Lieutenant Colonel (Rtd) Nigel Timothy Rory Steevenson – For services to Spinal Injury Research
- Bernard Stevens – For services to the Kinder Mountain Rescue Team and to Young People and the community in Greater Manchester
- Anne Elizabeth Stewart – Volunteer. For services to the community in Nairn
- Rosalind Mary Stoddart – Founder and Artistic Director, Fermynwoods Contemporary Art and Deep Roots Tall Trees. For services to the Visual and Performing Arts
- William Frank Gourlay Strang – Lately Deputy Director, Europe Division, Scottish Government. For services to Intercultural Dialogue and Interfaith Relations
- Christopher Swadkin – For services to Cricket and to Young People in South East London
- Rachel Nicola Tackley – Theatre Consultant, Producer and Curator. For services to the Arts
- Abu Taher – Co-Founder, Shanghati Literary Society. For services to the Bangladeshi Community
- Hamish Adie Tait – Chair, Heart Start. For services to Public Access to Defibrillators
- Catherine Louise Taylor-Weetman – Consultant in Dental Public Health, Shropshire and Staffordshire Dental Local Professional Network, NHS England. For services to Dentistry
- Kerry Ann Alice Tear – Safer Prisons Death in Custody Liasion Administrator, HM Prison Littlehey, HM Prison and Probation Service. For services to Care and Wellbeing
- Terry David Thatcher – Geospatial Specialist, Submarine Operations and Support, UK Hydrographic Office. For services to Defence
- Desmond Bruin Angus Thompson FRSE – Scientific Advisory Committee Member, Royal Botanic Garden, Edinburgh and lately Principal Adviser on Biodiversity and Science, NatureScot. For services to Nature Conservation
- Margaret Rose Thompson – For services to Girlguiding
- Megan Jane Ellis Thorpe – Faculty Development Adviser, NATO Mission Iraq. For services to Defence
- Lydia Tischler – Holocaust Survivor and Child Psychotherapist. For services to Holocaust Remembrance and Child Psychology
- Ella Ann Toone – Athlete, England Senior Women's Football Team. For services to Association Football.
- Benjamin David Towers – Founder and Chief Executive Officer, Happl. For services to the Startup Business Community, Excellence in Innovation and Enterprise
- John Francis Towers – Headmaster, Barrow Hills School, Godalming, Surrey. For services to Education
- Andrew Train – Leader, Birmingham Community Paddle Sports Project. For services to Sport
- Nigel James Travis BEM – For services to Boxing and the community in Moss Side, Greater Manchester
- Christopher Jeremy Tredwin – Lately Head, Peninsula Dental School. For services to General Practice
- David John Trenchard – Lately Chair, Leatherbarrow Removals and Storage. For services to Charity and to the community in Bournemouth
- Andrew James Trevett – Medical Director, Orkney Hyperbaric Unit. For services to Medicine, to Diving, and to the community of Orkney
- Alan Tully – Assistant Director, HM Revenue and Customs. For services to Law Enforcement and Combatting Fiscal Fraud
- Kerry Lorraine Turner – Chief Executive Officer, Citizens Advice Solihull Borough. For services to Citizens Advice and the community in Solihull
- Alastair David Upton – Chief Executive Officer, Creative Folkestone. For services to Art
- Sajid Ebrahim Varda – Founder and Chief Executive Officer, UK Muslim Film and Muslim International Film Festival. For services to Diversity and Inclusion in the Film and Television Industry
- Julia Elvira Caroline Wanda Verne – Lately Head of Health and Social Care Epidemiology, Department of Health and Social Care. For services to End of Life Care and Public Health
- Natalie Wade BEM – Founder, Small Green Shoots and Founder, The Cat's Mother. For services to the Creative Industries
- Philip David Wadey – Regional Access Officer, British Horse Society. For services to Public Rights of Way
- Neil Patrick Michael Walden – Non-Executive Member, NHS Cornwall and Isles of Scilly Integrated Care Board. For services to Healthcare
- Keira Fae Walsh – Athlete, England Senior Women's Football Team. For services to Association Football.
- Stephen John Ward – Founder, Mind Active. For services to the community in Northumberland
- Marcus Wareing – Chef. For services to the Culinary Arts and to Broadcasting
- Rachael Warwick – Lately Chief Executive Officer, Ridgeway Education Trust, Oxfordshire. For services to Education
- Susan Elizabeth Watson – Home Manager, Pytchley Court Care Home. For services to Adult Social Care
- Robert Charles Hugh Wedderburn – Master Woodcarver. For services to the Craft of Woodcarving
- Patricia Welsh – Lately Warm Homes Team Manager, Hull City Council. For services to Energy Efficiency and to Alleviating Fuel Poverty
- Annabel Chaundy Westman – For services to Heritage, in particular to the Attingham Trust and to Historic Textiles
- Jonathan Wheatley – Managing Director, Stonebarn Landscapes Limited. For services to Horticulture and to Charity
- Jane Wheeler – Assistant Director, Family Help, Prevention and Youth Justice, Cumberland Council. For services to Children and Families
- Lucy Whitehouse – Founder and Chief Executive Officer, Fumble. For services to Teenage Education
- James Whiting – Chief Executive Officer, The Skinny Food Company. For services to the Food Industry
- Caroline Whittaker – Professional Lead Nursing Midwifery and Standards Manager, Public Health Wales. For services to Nursing and Voluntary Work
- Miriam Elisabeth Wilcox – Co-Founder, In2Out. For services to Reducing Reoffending and to Young People
- Terence John Wilcox – Co-Founder and Chair, In2Out. For services to Reducing Reoffending and to Young People
- Caroline Ann Wilson – For services to the community in Dyfed
- Craig Beresford Wilson – Chief Executive Officer, Williams Advanced Engineering. For services to Enterprise and to the Economy
- Esther Mary Eleanor Wilson – Foster Carer. For services to Foster Care
- Gareth Owen Wilson – For services to the Leaseholders of Celestia Development, Cardiff Bay
- Andrew Kevin Windass – Senior Engineer, AGH Engineering Ltd. For services to Rail Engineering
- Alice Katherine Wiseman – Director of Public Health, Gateshead Council and Vice-President, Association of Directors of Public Health. For services to Public Health
- Margaret Anne Wood – Lately Director of Nursing and Quality, Practice Plus Group. For services to Patients in Health and Justice Systems
- Katy Louise Woodington – UK Team Lead Community Investments, RWE Renewables. For services to the Charitable and Energy Sectors
- Colin Wright – Co-Founder, Rushmoor Gymnastics Academy. For services to Women's Gymnastics
- Marie Bernadette Wright – Co-Founder, Rushmoor Gymnastics Academy. For services to Women's Gymnastics
- Richard Elliott Wright – Retired Police Superintendent. For services to the Welfare of Police Officers
- Jonathan Yates – Executive Director, Youth Endowment Fund. For services to Young People

=== British Empire Medal (BEM) ===
Ribbon of the British Empire Medal (Military Division)

Ribbon of the British Empire Medal (Civil Division)

Civil

- Erno Kalman Abelesz (Yisrael Abelesz). For services to Holocaust Remembrance
- Samantha Louise Abrahams, Founder and Musical Director, La La Choirs. For services to the community in Devon
- Fatima Ahmad, Foster Carer, Kirklees Council. For services to Foster Care
- Joanne Aicken. For Public Service
- Gillian Rebecca Ainslie, Tutor and Assessor, Plymouth Life Centre Bowls Club. For services to the community in Plymouth
- Graeme Muir Allan, Volunteer Medical Director, Southport Macmillan Centre and Lately Cancer Lead GP in Sefton. For services to the community in Southport.
- David Rodney Allen, President, Western Area, British Judo Association and Senior Coach, Exmouth Vikings. For services to Judo
- Janet Maureen Angel, Executive Officer to Chief Executive Welsh European Funding Office, Welsh Government. For Public Service
- Sally Crawford Angell-James. For services to Defibrillator Provision in Shropshire
- Philip James Annis, Volunteer, Downside Fisher Youth Club. For services to the community in the London Borough of Southwark
- Dean Ron James Appleton, Community First Responder, East of England Ambulance Service NHS Trust. For services to the community in the East of England
- Ryan Frank Ron Appleton, Community First Responder, East of England Ambulance Service NHS Trust. For services to the community in the East of England
- Jake Oliver Armstrong, Careers Leader, Addey and Stanhope School, London Borough of Lewisham. For services to Education
- Susan Arnold, Co-Founder, Sirhowy Hill Woodlands CIC. For services to the community in Tredegar
- Nina Bale. For services to the Homeless Community in Kendal, Cumbria
- Elaine Balfour, Lately Leader, 62nd Glasgow Girls' Brigade. For services to the community in Glasgow
- Joan Eilleen Barfield. For services to the community in Colchester, Essex
- Gail Victoria Bedding, Chair, Challengers. For services to Charitable Fundraising
- Amila Begumahmed (Amila Ahmed), Teaching Assistant, Cyril Jackson Primary, London Borough of Tower Hamlets. For services to Education
- Caroline Bentham. For services to the community in Ripon, North Yorkshire
- Nunzia Bertali. For services to UK/Italy Relations and to the community in Wirral
- Leonie Biggenden, Learning Volunteer, Natural History Museum. For services to Heritage
- Elizabeth Bilk, Fundraiser, The Royal British Legion. For services to the community in the Isle of Wight
- Thomas Blatcher Bindoff. For services to Outdoor Accessibility to Nature
- Susan Jane Bohanan, Special Constabulary Co-Ordinator, Staffordshire Police. For services to the community in Staffordshire
- Jordyn Aiden Jones Bond, Senior Scientist, Defence Science and Technology Laboratory, Ministry of Defence. For services to Defence
- Rosanne Moncur Bond. For services to the community in Guildford, Surrey
- Nicholas James Bown. For services to Advance Information Security
- Sally Bridge, Student Support Administrator, Queen's University Belfast. For services to Equality, Diversity and Inclusion
- Eglantine Browne, Chief Executive Officer, Nubian Life. For services to the Afro-Caribbean Community in the London Borough of Hammersmith and Fulham
- Alan Gilbert Brydon, Composer and Songwriter. For services to Music in Hawick, Scotland
- Dean Paul Buckle. For services to the community in Wetherby, West Yorkshire
- Clive George Buckley, Lately Chair, Solihull Fundraising Branch, Royal National Lifeboat Institution. For Voluntary Service to the Royal National Lifeboat Institution.
- Jennifer Folda Burnham, Volunteer, St Mungo's. For Charitable Service
- Angela Jane Buss, Chair, Blackpool Revoe Big Local. For services to the community in Blackpool
- Roger Paul Butterfield. For services to the community in Bradford, West Yorkshire
- Adrienne Campbell, VIP Liaison Officer, London Heathrow Airport. For services to the Aviation Industry
- Peter Campbell. For services to Gaelic and Scottish Culture
- Andrew John Cant. For services to Music in Orkney
- Lindsey Ann Carman. For services to Charitable Fundraising
- Yvonne Carson, Health and Wellbeing Manager, Northern Health and Social Care Trust. For services to Tackling Loneliness
- Gillian Elizabeth Castle, Campaigner. For services to People Living with Stomas
- Francis Joseph Chamberlain, Director and Project Coordinator, Brierley Hill High Street Heritage Action Zone. For services to Heritage and to the community in Brierley Hill, West Midlands
- Lee-Anne Chapman, Senior Marketing Manager, The Scottish Government. For services to Autistic People Living in Scotland
- Philip John Charles. For services to the community in Abbots Bromley, Staffordshire
- Peter David Clark, Head of 16-19 Funding and Financial Support Policy, Department for Education. For services to Further Education
- Russell David Clark, Head of Languages Centre, University of Keele, Staffordshire. For services to Higher Education
- Kelly Clarke, Inclusion Manager, Hanson Academy, Bradford. For services to Education
- Margaret Clarke, Foster Carer. For services to Foster Care
- Dorothy Joan Clayton, Volunteer, St John Ambulance County Priory. For Voluntary Service
- Alun James Clements, Volunteer, Imperial War Museum Duxford. For Voluntary Service
- Lorie Coffey. For services to War Commemoration
- Susan Kathleen Collard, Fundraiser, Bone Cancer Research Trust. For Charitable Service
- Catherine Margaret Collins, Heritage Specialist Cleaning Team Leader, House of Lords. For services to Parliament
- Deborah Ann Compton, Heritage Cleaning Operative, House of Commons. For services to Parliament
- Martin John Coppack, Lately Director, FairByDesign. For services to Social Equality and Inclusion
- Peter Crathorne. For services to the community in Henley-in-Arden, Warwickshire
- John Crombie. For services to Music in Badenoch and Strathspey
- Sandra Crowder, Foster Carer. For services to Adoption and Foster Care
- Christopher Michael Cuff, Chair and Regional Medical Advisor South West, Royal National Lifeboat Institution. For services to Maritime Safety
- Michael Edward Cullen, Founder, The SpeedoMick Foundation. For Charitable Service
- Alexander William Dalgarno, Owner, Pittenderich Forest. For services to Tourism in the North East of Scotland
- Darren Shane Davies. For services to Rugby in Torfaen
- Derek Davies, Senior Researcher, Francis Crick Institute. For services to Technical Support in the Life Sciences
- Janet Anne Rose Davies. For services to the community in Walsall, West Midlands
- Julie Denley, Director of Primary, Community and Mental Health Services, Cwm Taf Morgannwg University Health Board. For services to Mental Health Services
- Andrew William Dewhurst, Co-Founder, Barking Badgers Cycling Club. For Charitable Service
- Sonia Dixon, VIP Liaison Officer, London Heathrow Airport. For services to the Aviation Industry
- Joyce Evelyn Smith Dixon (joyce white), Lately Head of Service for Orthoptics, Brighton and Sussex University Hospitals NHS Trust. For services to Orthoptic Patients
- Veronica Dougherty, Personal Secretary, Northern Ireland Policing Board. For Public Service
- Marion Dudgeon, Newcastle Station Support Officer, British Transport Police. For services to Transport Policing.
- David John Dugal, Photographer, The Courier. For services to the community in County Tyrone
- Penelope Ann Dyson, Secretary, Friends of The Royal British Legion Industries. For Voluntary Service
- David John Eadon. For services to the community in Rugby, Warwickshire
- Philip James Edwards, Chairman, Country Park Supporters Group. For services to Public Spaces in Hereford
- Craig Ellis. For services to the community in Huddersfield, West Yorkshire
- Adrian Robin Emery, Transport Volunteer, Royal Voluntary Service. For Voluntary Service
- Clive Gary Evans. For services to Charity and to the community in Surlingham, Norfolk
- David Everatt. For services to People Living with Disabilities in Leeds
- Joan Catherine Fairley. For services to the community in Sutton Coldfield, West Midlands
- Stephen Farbrother. For services to the community in Gorran Haven, Cornwall
- Jenifer Fell, Postmistress, Daventry Post Office. For services to the community in Hellidon, Northamptonshire
- Gilbert Feron. For services to the community in Cambuslang, Lanarkshire
- Stanley Izak Fisher, British Army Veteran. For services to Holocaust Remembrance
- Julie Fitzpatrick, Project Manager, Department for Work and Pensions. For services to Local and National Cancer Care
- Debra Fixter, Founder, Sprouts Community Food Charity. For services to the community in Stockton-on-Tees
- Ruth Flynn, Director of Sixth Form, La Retraite Roman Catholic Girls School, London Borough of Lambeth. For services to Further Education
- Annette Foale, Second Lieutenant, Berkshire Army Cadet Force. For Voluntary Service
- Rebecca Grace Foran-Coutts, Inclusion Manager, BAE Systems. For services to Veterans
- Ronald Sydney Ford. For services to the community in Torfaen
- Donald John Foster. For services to the community in Chesterfield, Derbyshire
- Kathryn Coral Foster. For Charitable and Voluntary Service to Alzheimer's Research UK, to Heritage and to the community in Shropshire
- Christine June Foy, Leader, Girlguiding. For services to Young People in Epping, Essex
- Diane Mary Fuller, Lately Chair, Sidmouth Health and Care Forum. For services to the community in Sid Valley, Devon
- Vivienne Elizabeth Fullerton, Registrar. For services to Local Government in Northern Ireland
- Michael George Sutton Garrod. For services to the community in Garvestone, Norfolk
- Carmel Pauline Garvey. For services to Dance in Tyrone, Northern Ireland
- Teresa Mary Gazi, Lead Clinical Nurse Specialist, City Hospice, Cardiff. For services to Nursing and to Hospice Care
- Maureen Alice Rhoda Geddes. For services to the community in Hatfield Broad Oak, Essex
- Helen Jane Gill. For services to People with Learning Disabilities in Worcestershire
- Glynis Gillam, Working Age Member Case Manager, Blind Veterans UK. For services to Veterans with Visual Impairments
- Thomas Allan Gilmour, Police Community Support Officer, British Transport Police. For services to Railway Safety
- Giuseppe Giordano. For Charitable Service
- Annabel Susan Alice Gittins, Chair, Association of Senior Children's and Education Librarians. For services to Young People
- Mark Glazer. For services to the community in the London Borough of Redbridge
- Carter Jack David Goodby. People Business Partner, London North Eastern Railway. For services to Diversity and Inclusion
- Thomas Antony Goodman. For services to Technology in the West Midlands
- Louise Marie Gough, Founder, Bright Sparks SCIO, Bonnyrigg, Midlothian. For services to Foster Care
- Emma Marie Green, Nursery Manager, The Little Lane Nursery, Stamford. For services to Early Years Education
- Mark Anthony Greenhalgh, Volunteer, Duke of Edinburgh's Award. For services to Young People in Nottingham
- Marjorie Ann Guiler. For services to Young People and to the community in County Down
- Christopher Gunton, Volunteer, Greenwich, Deptford and Rotherhithe Sea Cadets. For Voluntary Service
- Thomas Robert Haire. For services to Local Government and to the community in Belfast
- Brian John Hall. For Voluntary Service
- Claire Hall. For services to the community in Ryedale, North Yorkshire
- William Anthony Hall. For services to the Army Veterans Community
- Mary Hampson, Lately Probation Service Officer, Probation Board for Northern Ireland. For services to Community Safety
- Asma Reyaz Haq, Founder, Marks Gate Relief Project. For services to the communities in the London Boroughs of Barking and Dagenham, Havering and Redbridge
- Sheena Harrison, Duty Social Worker, North-East Wales Foster Care Services. For services to Young People in Foster Care
- Nigel David Hart. For services to Primary Care, Medical Research and Training
- Geoffrey Warren Hastings, Fundraiser and Founder, Trueman R66T State School Cricket League. For services to School Cricket and to Charity
- Leslie John Hawkins, Community Special Constable Co-Ordinator, Essex Police. For services to Policing and to the community in Essex
- Captain (rtd) Margaret Eyvor Haynes, Founder, Tuppenny Barn. For services to Education, to Sustainability, to the Environment and to the community in West Sussex
- Sonia Lynette Hazel, Assurance and Controls Manager, HS2, Network Rail. For services to Diversity and Inclusion in the Rail Sector
- John Hearn, Judo Instructor. For services to Judo and to the community in North East England
- Terence Hensby, Volunteer, Dronfield Rugby Club. For services to Community Rugby
- Frances Elizabeth Hill, Caretaker, John Ruskin School, Coniston, Cumbria. For services to Education
- Richard Graham Hill. For services to Charity in Staffordshire
- Robert Harding Hitch, Founder, Buttercups Sanctuary for Goats. For services to Goat Welfare
- Charles Frederick Hodges. For services to the community in Enville, Staffordshire
- Wayne Hodgson, Founder and Chair, Red Eagle Foundation. For services to Children in Kent
- Susan Holliday, Special Constable, Cumbria Constabulary. For services to Policing and to the community in Cumbria
- John Ernest Holt, Tenant Farmer, Droke Farm. For services to Sustainable Farming
- Ronald Gordon Homer, Treasurer, Yeovil Visually Impaired Bowls Club. For services to Blind and Partially-Sighted People in Somerset.
- Karen Louise Elsie Hopper, Volunteer, Girlguiding. For services to Girlguiding
- John Housley. For services to the community in Chapeltown, South Yorkshire
- Elizabeth Anne Howe. For services to the community in Kington Langley, North Wiltshire
- Stephen Graham Howe. For services to the community in Kington Langley, North Wiltshire
- Alison Jane Humphreys. For services to people with Memory Loss and Dementia
- Diana Ray Hunt. For services to the Local Environment in Suffolk
- Dominic Hurley, Fundraiser. For services to Charity
- Donna-Marie Inwood, Chair, Leecliffe Big Local. For services to the community in Leecliffe, Borehamwood
- The Reverend David Stephen Ireland, Lately Chief Executive, Francis House Children's Hospice. For services to Children's Hospices
- Alison Jayne Irwin, Lately Head of Equality, Northern Health and Social Care Trust. For services to Health and Social Care in Northern Ireland
- Naomi Clare Rees Issitt, Founder, OurJay Foundation. For services to Defibrillator Training and Awareness in Rugby, Warwickshire
- Amy Elizabeth Jackson, Co-Founder and Operations Manager, The Lily Mae Foundation. For services to Bereaved Parents
- Ryan Paul Jackson, Co-Founder and Managing Director, The Lily Mae Foundation. For services to Bereaved Parents
- David John James. For services to Young People
- Lorna Anne Janse van vuuren. For services to the community in Upper Woodford, Wiltshire
- Samuel Jardine. For Public Service and to the community in County Armagh
- Gary Johnson, Co-Founder, Reading Rockets Basketball Club. For services to Basketball and to Charity
- Helen Johnson, Co-Founder, Reading Rockets Basketball Club. For services to Basketball and to Charity
- John Melvyn Johnson, Volunteer, Wolverhampton Grammar School, West Midlands. For services to Education
- Anne Jones. For services to the community in Northampton, Northamptonshire
- Gwyn Jones, Lately Cattle Sector Group Chair, Animal Health and Welfare Pathway. For services to Animal Health and Welfare
- Mark Robert Jones, Customer Assistant, Southeastern. For services to Community Railway.
- Philip Michael Jones, Junior Chief Coach, York City Rowing Club. For services to Rowing and Young People in York
- Manjinder Singh Kang, Community Safety Manager, Network Rail. For services to Rail Safety and to Charity
- Kathleen Kaye, Children's Nursery Practitioner. For services to Early Years Childcare in Dumfries and Galloway
- Mervyn Sydney Kersh, British Army Veteran of the Normandy Landings and Bergen-Belsen. For services to Holocaust Remembrance and Education
- Iain William Lamond, Battalion Secretary and Officer in Charge of The Boys' Brigade Scone Company Section. For services to The Boys' Brigade
- Bernadette Langfield, Founder, Shy Lowen Horse and Pony Sanctuary. For services to Charity
- Robin Langton-Dodds. For services to Disadvantaged Young People in the London Borough of Lambeth
- Wendy Alison Latty, Dance Teacher, Alison School of Dance. For services to Dance
- David Russel Lerner. For services to the Jewish community in the London Borough of Harrow
- Barry Coleman Leveton. For services to the Jewish Community in Norwich
- Maureen Ann Leveton. For services to the Jewish Community in Norwich.
- Arnold Sydney Lewis. For services to the Jewish Community in Liverpool
- Jacqueline Lowe, Foster Carer, St Helens Borough Council, St Helens, Merseyside. For services to Foster Care
- Norman Lowe, Foster Carer, St Helens Borough Council, St Helens, Merseyside. For services to Foster Care
- Charlotte Anne Luckett, Principal Surveyor, Valuation Office Agency. For Public Service and to Charity
- Mary Ann Macfarlane. For services to Community Care and Charity
- John Leslie Mackey. For services to Table Tennis
- Glynis Smith Macleod, Lately Medical Secretary, NHS Orkney. For services to the NHS and to the community in Orkney
- David Campbell James Main, Lately Chair, Animals in Science Committee, Home Office. For services to Animal Welfare
- Pamelia Lenora Marks. For services to the community in Sussex
- Gillian Anne Marriott. For services to the Church and to the community in Long Eaton, Derbyshire
- Robin Kenneth Marriott. For services to the community in Northampton
- Linda Susan Marshall. For services to the community in Fleckney, Leicestershire
- Susan Renee Marshall. For services to Education and to the community in Weston-super-Mare, Somerset
- Dudley Martin, Volunteer Lead Force Chaplain, West Yorkshire Police. For services to the Policing Community
- Bhajan Matharu, Assistant Headteacher, Deanesfield Primary School, London Borough of Hillingdon. For services to Education and Early Years
- Marion Elizabeth Maxey. For services to Young People and to Music
- Robert Anthony Mays. For services to Parkinson's Disease Sufferers and to Charitable Fundraising
- Bartholomew Mccran, Volunteer. For services to The Royal British Legion and to Ex-Service People in Glasgow
- Clare Alexis Mccullagh, Nursery Director, Rosedene Nurseries Limited. For services to Early Years Education
- Jan Blackwood Mcculloch haynes, Practice Manager, Barns Medical Practice, Ayr. For services to Practice Management and Education
- Margaret Anne Mcdonald, Founder and Chair, Car4U. For services to People with Cancer in Falkirk
- Joanne Naomi Mcintyre, Founder Member, TTPNetwork Patient Support Group. For services to People Affected by Thrombotic Thrombocyopenic Purpura and to Domestic Abuse
- Niree Kathleen Mcmorris. For services to the community in Londonderry
- John Mcmurran, Building Supervisor, Donaghadee Primary School. For services to Education and to the community in Donaghadee
- Captain David Alexander Mcnamee. For services to the community in Slaidburn and the Hodder Valley, Lancashire
- Jonathan Mcnee, Senior Marine Officer, Department of Agriculture, Environment and Rural Affairs (Northern Ireland). For Voluntary Service to Military Aviation Archaeology in Northern Ireland
- Colin Allen Mercer. For services to the community in Botley, Hampshire
- Malcolm Metcalf, Fundraiser. For Charitable Service
- Florence Victoria Methven – For Voluntary Service to the NSPCC and to the community in Newcastle, County Down
- Alison Rosalind Milne, Highland Dance Teacher. For services to Highland Dancing
- Ffion Lucy Mitchell-Langford, Hiraeth Yn Y Môr Project Lead, Marine Conservation Society. For services to the Natural Marine Environment and to the communities in North Wales
- Janice McKay Monty, Trustee and lately Chief Executive Officer, Shaftesbury Youth Club, Merseyside, and lately Chief Executive Officer, Tranmere Rovers in the Community. For services to the community in The Wirral
- Hilda Moore, Tennis Coach and Volunteer. For services to Tennis
- Maria Moore. For services to the community in Southampton, Hampshire
- Gerald Bennett Morris. For services to the community in the Parish of Perranzabuloe, Cornwall
- Canon John Thomas Naylor, Music Director, Nantwich Choral Society. For services to Music
- Mary Marian Nicholas. For services to People with Learning Disabilities in Northern Ireland
- Susan Ann Nichols, Deputy Manager, Fledglings Day Nursery, Solihull. For services to Early Years Education
- Michael Nicholson, Crew Manager, Clough Road and Hull Central Fire Stations, Humberside Fire and Rescue Service. For services to the Humberside Fire and Rescue Service and to the community in Humberside
- Gerald Thomas Nickless. For services to the community in Shifnal, Shropshire
- Alastair Scott Norman. For services to the community in Stourpaine, Dorset
- Stewart Thomas Norris, Squadron Leader, Commanding 875 (Westhill) Squadron RAF Air Cadets. For services to Young People in Aberdeenshire
- Angela Patricia O'callaghan. For services to Health and Wellbeing in the Workplace
- Christine Marie Pattinson, Volunteer, Distington Big Local. For services to the community in Distington, West Cumbria
- Pritesh Pattni, Postmaster, Bristol Street Post Office. For services to the community in Birmingham and to Charity
- Raymond Stockan Peace, Pipe Major. For services to Music, Culture and to the community in Orkney
- Ronald William Pearson, Chair, Groundsman and Secretary, Gwersyllt Park Cricket Club. For services to Cricket
- Shaun Rodney Pelling, Warrant Officer Class 1 (Regimental Sergeant Major) for Headquarters Southeast Army Cadet Force. For Voluntary Service to Young People
- David John Pendall, Volunteer Coach, Bedford Rowing Club. For services to Rowing and to Young People in Bedford
- Indra Rukmani Perera, Early Years Leader, Rainbow House, London. For services to Early Years Education
- Judith Ann Pickess, Leader, Girlguiding. For services to Young People in Essex
- Ann Elizabeth Pike, Chair of Carers of West Lothian and lately Vice-Chair of West Lothian's Third Sector Interface. For service to the community and Third Sector in West Lothian
- Kanti Karsan Pindoria, Police Staff, Special Constable and Volunteer Police Cadet Leader, Metropolitan Police Service. For services to Policing and to the community in London
- Geoffrey Philip Pinney, Group President, West Hatch Scout Group. For services to Young People in Somerset
- Alice Florence Potter, Police Volunteer Christian Police Association and Chaplain, Surrey Police. For services to Policing and to the community in Surrey
- Elisabeth Kathleen Pugh, Co-Founder and Producer, Walk the Plank. For services to the Arts
- Dorothy Jean Pullen. For services to Military Personnel
- Susan Lynne Raymond, Interview Manager, Office for National Statistics. For services to Statistics
- Lisa Riding, Head of the Speech and Communication Specialist Resource, St Thomas ? Becket, Wakefield, West Yorkshire. For services to Education
- Ryan Francis Masterman Riley, Founder, Life Kitchen. For services to Sufferers of Loss of Taste
- Christopher John Mostyn Roberts. For services to Young People, to Charity and to Music
- Kevin Peter Robinson, Director of Cetacean Research and Rescue Unit and Leading Marine Ecologist. For services to the Protection of UK Whales, Dolphins and Porpoises
- Richard Barry Rosenberg, Trustee and Fundraiser, Teenage Cancer Trust. For Charitable Service
- Elena Rossi, Breastfeeding Support Volunteer, Swindon, Wiltshire. For services to the community in Swindon and Wiltshire
- Tracy Rowland, Founder, Ready Steady Go, Monmouthshire. For services to Children and Young Adults with Autistic Spectrum Disorder
- Keith Ruddle, Volunteer Co-Ordinator, Chipping Norton News. For services to the community in Chipping Norton, Oxfordshire
- Marguerite Olive Ruffles, Home Library Service Volunteer, Royal Voluntary Service. For Voluntary Service
- William Ryan, Founder, Saltash Rugby Football Club. For services to Rugby Football in Cornwall
- Shaeera Fatima Sahi. For services to Young People
- Neil Anthony Salt, Constituency Officer, Streatham and Croydon North, Lambeth and Southwark Conservative Federation. For Political Service
- Andrew John Salter, Apprentice Training Manager, AWE plc. For services to Defence Engineering and to Young People
- Ian Malcolm Sandiford JP DL. For services to the community in Rochdale, Greater Manchester
- Diane Christine Sangster, Manager, Cosmos Community Centre, St Andrews. For services to Community Education and Childcare
- Scott Saunders. For services to Emergency Response and to the community in Telford
- Iolene Jennifer Scholes. For services to the community in Shipston-On-Stour, Warwickshire
- Janis Ina Mary Scott. For services to the community in Melton Mowbray, Leicestershire
- Debra Marie Scotting. For services to the community in Warmington, Northamptonshire
- Victoria Louise Seymour, Lately Tutor, Somerset Skills and Learning. For services to Skills
- Erika Shearer, Director of Music, The Orkney Traditional Music Project. For services to Traditional Fiddle and Accordion Tuition
- Ian Philip Shepherd. For services to the community in High Wycombe, Buckinghamshire
- Toby Shevlane, Co-Founder, Mantic. For services to AI Innovation.
- Jane Elizabeth Shore. For services to the community in Wickersley, South Yorkshire
- John Graham Silverwood. For services to the community in Stocksbridge, South Yorkshire
- Anna Simmons, Treasurer and Board Member, ASCEL. For services to Libraries
- Elaine Olga Simmons, Dental Nurse Tutor and Internal Quality Assessor, The Academy of Dental Nursing Ltd. For services to Dentistry and Dental Nursing
- Lesley-Ann Joy Simpson, Chief Executive, The Chestnut Appeal. For services to Men's Health
- Sileas Sinclair, Conductor, Oban Gaelic Choir, Composer and Music Arranger. For services to Scottish Music and Culture
- Sabhijinder Singh Hayer (Sam Hayer), Gym Manager, Sam's Gym and Head Coach, Oldbury Academy Weightlifting Club. For services to Weightlifting and to the community in the West Midlands
- Margaret Anne Slucutt, Co-Chair of South Gloucestershire Council Age-friendly Delivery Group. For services to the community in South Gloucestershire.
- David Robert Smith. For services to the community in Datchet, Berkshire
- Elaine Smith, Chief of Staff, Royal Navy Develop Directorate. For services to Defence and to Charitable Fundraising
- Katherine Anne Smith. Fundraiser. For services to Brain Tumour Research and to Charity
- David Harry Stembridge KC. For services to the community in Newton Ferrers and Noss Mayo, Devon
- Angela Frances Stevenson, For services to Suicide Prevention and Mental Health Support in North East England
- Christine Alice Storry, Procurement Manager, Bath and North-East Somerset Council. For services to Sustainable and Local Food Procurement
- Beverley Anne Stotesbury, Volunteer, St John Ambulance Hampshire. For Voluntary Service to Community First Aid
- Sara Lindsay Strong. For services to the community in Oxfordshire
- James Joseph Sullivan. For services to Refugees and Asylum Seekers and to the community in Birmingham
- Cindy Marie Sutcliffe, Inclusion Manager, Hanson Academy, Bradford, West Yorkshire. For services to Education
- Jason Sweeney. For services to the community in Hebburn, Tyne and Wear
- Dawn Frances Taylor. For services to the community in Rossendale, Lancashire.
- Julie Taylor. For services to the community in Maldon, Essex
- Olwyn Taylor. For services to the community in Debdale Park, Gorton, Greater Manchester
- Jonathan Ross Tear, Head of Public Body Reviews, Department for Transport. For services to Diversity and Inclusion, and to Charity
- Barbara Ann Thomas. For services to the community in Mere, Wiltshire
- Barbara Anne Thomas, Emergency Response Volunteer, North Wales, British Red Cross, For Voluntary Service to the Red Cross
- Justin Matthew Thomas, Police Staff, West Midlands Police and Founder, Young Gloves Karate. For services to Young People
- Kathryn Thomas, Senior Programme Manager, Aneurin Bevan University Health Board. For services to Volunteer Management and Community Support
- James Edward Thompson, Special Constable, Northumbria Police. For services to Policing
- Lloyd Anthony Thompson, Founder and Director, Tranquil Productions and Tech Styles International. For services to Young People and to the community in Bradford through Hip Hop and Dance
- Jill Patricia Thorley, Volunteer Co-Ordinator, The Chipping Norton News. For services to the community in Chipping Norton
- Commodore Stephen Thorne RD. For services to the community in Dorset
- Douglas Alan Timms. For Charitable Service to the community in Carterton, Oxfordshire
- Pauline Mary Timms. For Charitable Service to the community in Carterton, Oxfordshire
- Adam James Tinsley. For services to the community in Maltby, South Yorkshire
- David Martin Tomlinson, Co-Founder, Chair of Trustees and Project Manager, Acting on Impulse. For services to the community in Greater Manchester
- Suzan Lorelle Tomlinson, Co-Founder and Project Manager, Acting on Impulse. For services to the community in Greater Manchester
- David John Toop. For services to the community in Whittlesford, Cambridgeshire
- Barry Francis Turner. For services to the community in Oldbury-on-Severn, Gloucestershire
- Jennifer Anne Turner, School Crossing Patrol. For services to Road Safety.
- Rachel Sandra Turner, Lately Councillor, Reigate and Banstead Borough Council. For Political Service
- Richard Glegg Turner. For services to the community in Thurstaton, Merseyside
- Sahina Ugradar. For services to the community in Ilford, London Borough of Redbridge
- John Vincent, Owner, The Network – Tackling Social Exclusion. For services to Public Libraries
- Pamela Janet Waite, President and lately Chair of the Royal British Legion Port Talbot. For services to Charity and to Veterans
- Frances Walker, Chair, Worksop Priory and Gatehouse Community Trust. For services to the community in Bassetlaw
- Simon John Walsh, Procurement Director and Joint Greater Manchester Procurement Lead, Manchester University NHS Foundation Trust. For services to the NHS and Charity
- John Edwin Warren, Nursery Director, Kingsway Nursery Group, London and Managing Director and Freelance Consultant, John Warren Consultancy. For services to Early Years and Education
- John Wassell, Co-Founder and Creative Producer, Walk the Plank. For services to the Arts
- Colonel (Rtd) David Ian Waters TD, President, Lancashire Armed Forces Association. For Voluntary Service to Veterans
- Amy Natasha Watson, Foster Carer, Bedfordshire Council, Bedfordshire. For services to Foster Care
- Ross William Watson, Foster Carer, Bedfordshire Council, Bedfordshire. For services to Foster Care
- Pamela Weatherington. For services to Young People in Oundle, Northamptonshire
- Geoffrey Wellens. For services to Heritage and to the community in Middleton, Greater Manchester
- Colin Henry Wells, Ambulance Support Volunteer, West Midlands, British Red Cross. For Voluntary Service
- Valentine Freeman West. For services to Charitable Causes and to the Gurkha and Afghan communities in Colchester, Essex
- Tina Emily Whitmore. For services to the community in Eastbourne
- Jacqueline Yvonne Whitnell, Nurse, Lime Tree Primary Care Practice. For services to the NHS and to Higher Education
- Mark John Whittaker. For services to the community in Marple, Greater Manchester
- Serena Wiebe, Boxing Coach and Youth Voice Ambassador, Empire Fighting Chance and Knife Crime Campaigner. For services to Young People
- Rosalind Mary Willatts. For services to the community in Wilbarston, Northamptonshire
- Rachel Anne Williams, Volunteer, Church and Community. For services to the community in Toddington
- James John Wilson, Chair, Bonnyrigg Rose Community Football Club. For services to Youth Development, Sport and to Community Empowerment
- Eleanor Dorothy Wolfenden-Orr. For services to Charitable Fundraising and to the community in Northern Ireland
- Gail Elizabeth Wood, Fundraiser, Cancer Research UK. For Charitable Services
- Stephen Christopher Woodley, Member and lately Chair, Canterbury Lawn Tennis Club. For services to Tennis in Kent
- Elizabeth Woodworth. For services to Smoking Cessation
- Angela Wooller, Apprenticeship and Qualifications Manager, East Sussex County Council. For services to Further Education
- Rebecca Wray, For services to Volunteering in Northern Ireland
- Brenda Irene Wright, Volunteer, St Issey Church of England Primary School, Wadebridge, Cornwall. For services to Education

=== Royal Red Cross ===
Ribbon of the Royal Red Cross

==== Member of the Royal Red Cross (RRC) ====
- Lieutenant Colonel Susan Elizabeth Hines, Royal Army Medical Service
- Lieutenant Colonel Heather Dawn Saunders VR, Royal Army Medical Service, Army Reserve
- Warrant Officer Laura Louise Gardner
- Squadron Leader Sally Jane Tippett

==== Associates of the Royal Red Cross (ARRC) ====
- Captain Rhian Francesca Lynne Jones, Royal Army Medical Service
- Major Jane Alexandra Keenan, Royal Army Medical Service
- Warrant Officer Laura Louise Gardner
- Squadron Leader Sally Jane Tippett

=== King's Police Medal (KPM) ===
Ribbon of the King's Police Medal for Distinguished Service

England and Wales

- Adesola Monsuru Adelekan, MVO, Deputy Assistant Commissioner, Metropolitan Police Service
- Paul Brogden, Commander, Metropolitan Police Service
- Robert John Carden, Chief Constable, Merseyside Police
- Jonathan Miles Chadwick, Detective Chief Superintendent, Greater Manchester Police
- Jason Leigh Diamond, Temporary Inspector, North Wales Police
- Andrew Huddleston, lately Superintendent, Northumbria Police
- Justine Keely Jenkins, lately Detective Inspector, Hertfordshire Police
- Richard John Munns, lately Superintendent, Metropolitan Police Service
- Mark Royston Plant, lately Detective Constable, West Midlands Police
- Samantha Rennison, Chief Superintendent, Northumbria Police
- Daniel Hugh Frisby Richards, lately Chief Superintendent, South Wales Police
- Kevin Mark Southworth, Deputy Assistant Commissioner, Metropolitan Police Service
- Sian Louise Thomas, Detective Superintendent, Metropolitan Police Service
- Mark Steven Travis, lately Assistant Chief Constable, South Wales Police
- Heather Millicent Whoriskey, Detective Chief Superintendent, West Yorkshire Police

Scotland

- Stephen Dolan, Chief Superintendent, Police Service of Scotland
- Joanna Farrell, Chief Constable, Police Service of Scotland
- Andrew Robert Freeburn, MBE, lately Assistant Chief Constable, Police Service of Scotland

Northern Ireland

- Sharon Elizabeth Cromie, Sergeant, Police Service of Northern Ireland
- Robert James McGowan, Superintendent, Police Service of Northern Ireland
- John Patrick Sayers, Chief Inspector, Police Service of Northern Ireland

=== King's Fire Service Medal (KFSM) ===
Ribbon of the King's Fire Service Medal for Distinguished Service

England and Wales

- Wayne Mitchell Bowcock, Chief Fire Officer and Chief Executive, Royal Berkshire Fire and Rescue Service
- Hannah Mary Caulfield, Group Manager, Cheshire Fire and Rescue Service
- Charles Morgan Francis Puglsey, lately Deputy Commissioner, London Fire Brigade

Scotland

- Alexander Muir, Firefighter, Scottish Fire and Rescue Service
- Stuart Stevens, Chief Officer, Scottish Fire and Rescue Service

Isle of Man

- Mark Christian, Chief Fire Officer, Isle of Man Fire and Rescue Service

Jersey

- Jane Ann Philpott, lately Deputy Chief Fire Officer, States of Jersey Fire and Rescue Service

=== King's Ambulance Service Medal (KAM) ===
Ribbon of the King's Ambulance Service Medal

England and Wales

- Catherine John, Locality Manager, Swansea, Welsh Ambulance Service
- Christopher Charles Mann, Operations Officer, South Western Ambulance Service
- Alison Walker, lately Medical Director, West Midlands Ambulance Service

Scotland

- David Lee Bywater, Lead Consultant Paramedic, Scottish Ambulance Service

Isle of Man

- William Daniel Benjamin Bellamy, Director of Ambulance and Transfer Services, Isle of Man Ambulance Service

=== King's Volunteer Reserves Medal (KVRM) ===
Ribbon of the King's Volunteer Reserves Medal

- Warrant Officer Grantley Lloyd Churchward, Royal Air Force
- Lieutenant Colonel Robert Michael Friel VR, Royal Regiment of Artillery, Army Reserve
- Squadron Leader Glen Campbell Hymers, Royal Air Force
- Lance Corporal Angela Morrow VR, The Royal Logistic Corps, Army Reserve
- Major John Richards VR, Corps of Royal Electrical and Mechanical Engineers, Army Reserve
- Major Neeraj Shah VR, Royal Army Medical Service, Army Reserve
- Warrant Officer 2 John Campbell Stewart, Royal Marines Reserve
- Warrant Officer Class 1 Robert Alan Whelan VR, The Royal Logistic Corps, Army Reserve
- Wing Commander Robert Benjamin Williams, Royal Air Force

=== King's Commendation for Valuable Service ===
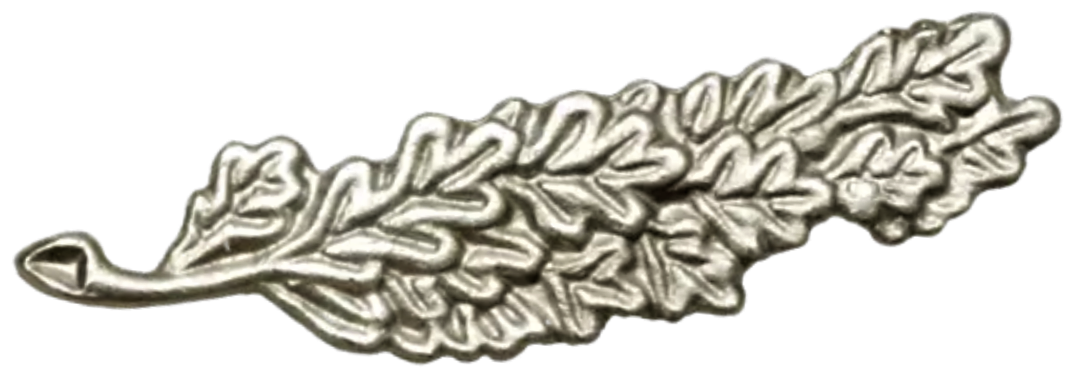
King's Commendation for Valuable Service device

- Commander Andrew Boardman, Royal Navy
- Colonel Roger John Cooper-Simpson, Royal Marines
- Captain Paul Franks, The Royal Logistic Corps
- Major Mark Stephen Gibbs, Royal Army Veterinary Corps
- Captain David John Hawksworth, The Corps of Royal Engineers
- Lieutenant Colonel Rupert Manwaring Hope-Hawkins, The King’s Royal Hussars
- Major James Edward Landers, Royal Regiment of Artillery
- Flying Officer Jonathan Michael Gillingham Lanham, Royal Red Cross
- Lieutenant Colonel Stewart James McKenzie, Intelligence Corps
- Staff Sergeant Martyn Sidney Derek Stanley, The Corps of Royal Engineers
- Lieutenant Colonel William John Lewis Tulloch, The Scots Guards

=== King's Commendation for Bravery ===
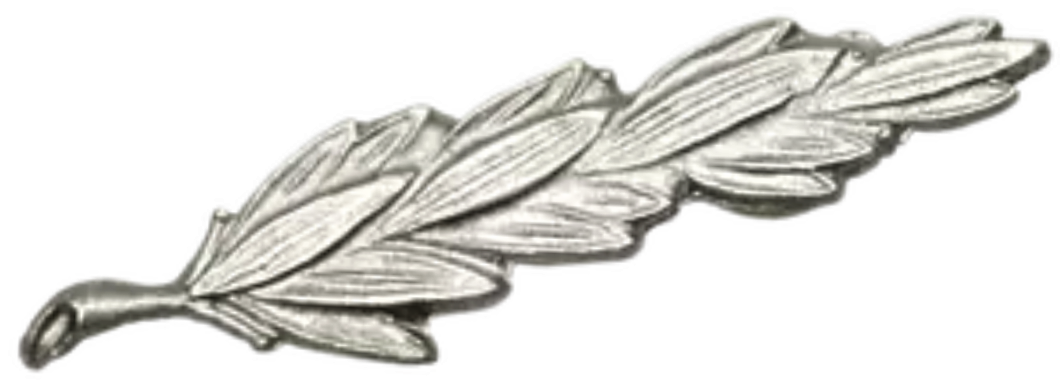
King’s Commendation for Bravery device

- Staff Sergeant Daniel Austin Howel, The Royal Logistic Corps

=== Overseas Territories Police Medal (OTPM) ===
Ribbon of the Overseas Territories Police Medal

- Xavier Buhagiar, Police Inspector, Gibraltar Defence Police – For services to police training and leadership in the Gibraltar Defence Police.
- Marcos Petrou, Chief Inspector, Sovereign Base Areas Police – For services to policing and security in the Sovereign Base Areas.

== Overseas and International ==
=== The Most Excellent Order of the British Empire ===
==== Member of the Order of the British Empire (MBE) ====
- Sean Aita – Theatre Director and Playwright. For services to English Language and UK Culture in Europe.
- Jean Ajin – Founder and Trustee, The Mityana Charity. For services to the local community in Mityana, Uganda.
- Jekhan Aruliah – Social and Entrepreneurship Coach. For services to Development in Sri Lanka.
- David Barnes – Founder, the Strath-Kenya Project – Strathallan School, Forgandenny. For services to Children and Young People in Perthshire and Kenya.
- Jacqueline Barrett – former Future Olympic Host Cities Director, International Olympic Committee. For services to International Olympic Sport.
- Andre Braithwaite – Music Director, Elmore Stoutt High School, British Virgin Islands. For services to Young People and the Music Industry in the British Virgin Islands.
- Stephen Cain – lately President, Triangle British American Business Council, North Carolina, United States of America. For services to UK/North Carolina Commercial and Cultural Relations.
- Robert Chatfield – Country Director, Argentina and Chile, British Council. For services to UK Soft Power and UK/Argentina Cultural Relations.
- Ahmad Masood Cheema – Consultant Surgeon, King Edward Memorial Hospital, Stanley, Falkland Islands. For services to the Falkland Islands.
- Kwangwook Cho – Professor of Neuroscience, King's College London. For services to UK/Korea Relations in the areas of Science and Health.
- Pauline Clarke – lately Head, Archive Search, Information & Digital Directorate, Foreign, Commonwealth and Development Office. For services to British Foreign Policy.
- Mark Collier – Missionary, Board Member and Trustee, Friends in Action International Northern Ireland. For services to the provision of drinking water in Africa.
- Carolyn Davison – former British Consul General, Osaka, Japan. For services to British Foreign Policy and British Trade and Investment.
- Gareth Davies – Executive Director, the European Cleft Organisation. For services to Health in the UK and Overseas.
- William Thornley Edmunds – Team Leader, Foreign, Commonwealth and Development Office. For services to National Security.
- Harry Lubin Fitzgerald – Team Leader, Foreign, Commonwealth and Development Office. For services to British Foreign Policy.
- Victoria Fletcher – Chair of the Board of Trustees, Women’s Centre Guirukhsor. For services to Women in Tajikistan.
- Thomas Forster – Principal Ballet Dancer, American Ballet Theatre. For services to Dance.
- Sarah Annable-Gardner – Chief Executive, Action Through Enterprise. For services to International Development in Ghana.
- Claudia Garland – lately First Secretary, Counterterrorism and Strategic Threats, British Embassy Washington, United States of America. For services to British Foreign Policy and National Security.
- Richard Hallows – Chair, the British Charitable Fund. For services to British Citizens in France.
- Sigurd Haveland – Chief Paramedic and Divisional Clinical Lead (Primary & Emergency Services), Gibraltar Health Authorities; Chief Executive Officer, St John's Ambulance – Gibraltar. For services to Health in Gibraltar.
- Robert Hoy – Christian Engineers in Development, Solace Ministries, Faith Centred Ministries Church, the Anglican Dioceses of Cyangugu and Byumba and The Safe Water Trust. For services to Water Engineering in Rwanda.
- Janet Jeffrey – Founder, Physiotherapy Outreach Programme. For services to Children with Disabilities in Lesotho.
- Gloria Hamilton-Lightbourne – Founder and former President, the National Cancer Society, the Turks and Caicos Islands. For services to Cancer Support and Health Advocacy in the Turks and Caicos Islands.
- Bruce John Lawton Lowe – Founding Member of the British American Chamber of Commerce, Great Lakes Region, Cleveland, Ohio, United States of America. For services to British Business in the United States of America.
- Tracey Claire Maund – Team Leader, Foreign, Commonwealth and Development Office. For services to National Security.
- Elizabeth Grier-Menager – Founder, Hands on London. For services to Volunteering and Charitable Fundraising.
- Annette Middleton – Registered Nurse; Trustee, Senior Nurse and Chief Organiser, Overseas Plastic Surgery Appeal. For services to Children suffering from Cleft Lip and Palate Conditions in Pakistan.
- Christina Kim Miller – former Head of UK Research Office, Brussels, Belgium. For services to UK Foreign Policy.
- Peter Nasmyth – Author and Conservator. For services to UK/Georgia relations.
- Ashley Peatfield – Co-Founder, The Funzi and Bodo Trust. For services to Development in Kenya.
- Sara Peatfield – Co-Founder and Trustee, The Funzi and Bodo Trust. For services to Development in Kenya.
- James John Reed – Team Leader, Foreign, Commonwealth and Development Office. For services to National Security.
- Caroline Amanda Rye – Team Leader, Foreign, Commonwealth and Development Office. For services to British Foreign Policy.
- Richard Tilley – British Honorary Consul Eswatini. For services to UK/Eswatini relations and to British Nationals in Eswatini.
- Angeline Turner – Iraq Senior Principal Research Analyst, Analysis Directorate, Foreign, Commonwealth and Development Office. For services to British Foreign Policy.
- Andrew Watts – Senior Detentions Adviser, Counter-Terrorism Department, Foreign, Commonwealth and Development Office. For services to National security.
- Matthew Willmore – lately Regional Counter-Terrorism Officer for Central Asia, British Embassy Tashkent, Uzbekistan. For services to Counter Terrorism in Central Asia.

=== British Empire Medal (BEM) ===
- Susan Anderson – Trustee and Executive Director, Atlas Foundation South Africa. For services to Charity through Sport.
- Thomas Ashe – Founder, Favela Brass. For services to Music Education in Rio de Janeiro.
- Alexander Canham – former Head, Corporate Services and British Consul, British Embassy Tehran, Iran. For services to British Foreign Policy.
- Terry Curran – Commander, Jávea Volunteer Fire Brigade, Spain. For services to Firefighting in Spain.
- Lee Edgar Davidson – Desk Officer, Foreign, Commonwealth and Development Office. For services to British Foreign Policy.
- Katherine Drew – Executive Director, The Melanesian Mission UK. For services to UK/Solomon Islands relations.
- Catherine Mentink Duncam – former Councillor of Tourism & Foreign Affairs, Calvia Town Hall, Mallorca, Spain. For services to British Nationals in Mallorca.
- Clare Goodall – lately Diary Secretary to the British High Commissioner to Pakistan. For services to British Foreign Policy.
- Joanna MacKenzie MacQueen – Chieftain, Saint Andrew’s Society; Vice President, British Commonwealth Society; Advisory Board Member, Royal British Legion. For services to preserving Scottish Traditions in Chile and to UK/Chile relations.
- Lynne McCutcheon – Founding Trustee and Chairman, and Secretary, New Futures Nepal. For services to Disadvantaged Children in Nepal and India.
- Clifford Parry – Teaching Operations Manager, British Council, Athens, Greece. For services to the English language and to UK/Greece Cultural Relations.
- Jacqueline Pries – Volunteer, The Christina Noble Children’s Foundation. For services to relieving Child Poverty in Mongolia.
- Christopher Shelbourne – Director and Founding Trustee, Christian Partners in Africa. For services to Disadvantaged Communities in Uganda and Ethiopia.
- Rosey Shelbourne – Director and Founding Trustee, Christian Partners in Africa. For services to Disadvantaged Communities in Uganda and Ethiopia.
- Glenn Stennes – Founder and President of CSO Macedonian Front Society, and Honorary Supervisor, Commonwealth War Graves Commission North Macedonia. For services to UK Military Heritage Preservation.
- Anthony Stevens – Founder, The Daneford Trust; Chair of Trustees of Hackney Caribbean Elderly Organisation; Trustee of Friends of Street Children, Bangladesh. For services to Disadvantaged Communities in the UK and Overseas.
- Juliet Stoker – Co-Founder & Trustee, Sparkes Homes Sri Lanka. For services to Orphaned and Vulnerable Girls in Sri Lanka.
- Claire Stratton – Co-Founder & Trustee, Sparkes Homes Sri Lanka. For services to Orphaned and Vulnerable Girls in Sri Lanka.
- Darren Wallace – Clerk of Works, Tenax, British Embassy Djibouti. For services to UK Overseas Infrastructure Projects.
- Ruth Walne – Nurse and Plaster Technician with Mercy Ships. For services to Children in Africa.
- Blanc Wan – Pianist, Musicologist, Immediate Past President of The Oxford and Cambridge Society of Hong Kong. For services to UK Higher Education and Music Culture in Hong Kong.

== The Bahamas ==
Appointments made by The King on the advice of his ministers in The Bahamas.

=== Most Excellent Order of the British Empire ===
Order of the British Empire ribbon (civil)

==== Officer of the Order of the British Empire (OBE) ====
Civil

- Rollie William Albury. For services to Business and Religion.
- Barbara Ann Bernard. For services to Financial Services.
- The Reverend Vaughan Lester Cash. For services to Religion.
- Percival Andrew Knowles. For services to Sports.

==== Member of the Order of the British Empire (MBE) ====
Civil

- Athama Mulend Bowe. For services to Tourism and Hospitality.
- Godfrey McDonald Gray. For services to Local Government and to Business.
- Jennifer Anne Kettle. For services to Education.

=== British Empire Medal (BEM) ===
British Empire Medal ribbon (civil)

Civil

- The Reverend Donnalee Victoria Bowe. For services to Public Service, Arts and Craft and Community Empowerment.

== Grenada ==
Appointments made by The King on the advice of his ministers in Grenada.

=== Most Excellent Order of the British Empire ===
Order of the British Empire ribbon (civil)

==== Officer of the Order of the British Empire (OBE) ====
Civil

- Beverley Grey. For services to Education.

==== Member of the Order of the British Empire (MBE) ====
Civil

- James Nicholas. For services to Fishing and Agriculture.
- Sandra Thomas. For services to Education

=== British Empire Medal (BEM) ===
British Empire Medal ribbon (civil)

Civil

- Irma Cynthia Lewis. For services to Agriculture.
- Neal Matheson. For services to Culture.

== Papua New Guinea ==
Appointments made by The King on the advice of his ministers in Papua New Guinea.

=== Most Distinguished Order of St Michael and St George ===
Order of St Michael and St George ribbon

==== Companion of the Order of St Michael and St George (CMG) ====
- Chief Yaungtine Koromba. For services to Politics.
- Michael Huanong Lin. For services to Business and to the Community

=== Most Excellent Order of the British Empire ===
Order of the British Empire ribbon (civil)

==== Knight / Dame Commander of the Order of the British Empire (KBE / DBE) ====
Civil

- Iammo Gapi Launa, OBE, BEM For services to Sports.
- Robert Bates, OBE For services to Business and to the Community.

==== Commander of the Order of the British Empire (CBE) ====
Civil

- Charles Kauvu Abel. For services to Business, to Music, to Politics, to the Community and Health Advocacy.

==== Officer of the Order of the British Empire (OBE) ====
Civil

- Lin Chenghao. For services to Business and to the Community.
- Basil Kambuliagen. For services to Papua New Guinea National Parliamentary Services.
- Ora Renagi. For services to Higher Education.
- The Honourable Peter Lemay Laurence Tsiamalili, MP For Public Service.

==== Member of the Order of the British Empire (MBE) ====
Civil

- Matthew Cannon. For services to St. John’s Ambulance Services.
- Joanne Clarkson, QPM, Deputy Commissioner. For services to Royal Papua New Guinea Constabulary.

=== British Empire Medal (BEM) ===
British Empire Medal ribbon (civil)

Civil

- Joseph Anjoku, Senior Inspector. For services to Royal Papua New Guinea Constabulary.
- Dickson Auguiom. For services to Morobe Provincial Administration.
- Siove Awiong. For services to Morobe Provincial Administration.
- Herman Birenka, Chief Sergeant. For services to Royal Papua New Guinea Constabulary.
- Steven Bunga, Superintendent. For services to Royal Papua New Guinea Constabulary.
- Kename Ken Elonaga. For services to Morobe Provincial Administration.
- Luvi Florian, Chief Inspector. For services to Royal Papua New Guinea Constabulary.
- Letapuna Kalo, Senior Sergeant. For services to Royal Papua New Guinea Constabulary.
- Simon Kesoso, Sergeant. For services to Royal Papua New Guinea Constabulary.
- Stanley Kila, Sergeant. For services to Royal Papua New Guinea Constabulary.
- Steven Kodana, Sergeant. For services to Royal Papua New Guinea Constabulary.
- Philip Koliadi, Chief Inspector. For services to Royal Papua New Guinea Constabulary.
- Joseph Kuande, Chief Sergeant. For services to Royal Papua New Guinea Constabulary.
- Sualapei Kudd, Chief Sergeant. For services to Royal Papua New Guinea Constabulary.
- Christopher Kunyanban, Chief Superintendent. For distinguished services to Royal Papua New Guinea Constabulary.
- Rachel Laing. For services as a country representative in World Athletics.
- Wilfred Larsin, Chief Sergeant. For services to Royal Papua New Guinea Constabulary.
- Rodney Malken, Chief Sergeant. For services to Royal Papua New Guinea Constabulary.
- William Melavia, Chief Sergeant. For services to Royal Papua New Guinea Constabulary.
- Silau Nambalasa, Chief Sergeant. For services to Royal Papua New Guinea Constabulary.
- Patty Namora, Sergeant. For services to Royal Papua New Guinea Constabulary.
- Lancelot Terry Paine. For services to Correctional Services in Papua New Guinea.
- John Piamu, Chief Sergeant. For services to Royal Papua New Guinea Constabulary.
- John Sagom, Chief Superintendent. For distinguished services to Royal Papua New Guinea Constabulary.
- Delilah Sandeka, Chief Inspector. For services to Royal Papua New Guinea Constabulary.
- Silva Sika, Acting Assistant Commissioner. For distinguished services to Royal Papua New Guinea Constabulary.
- Joel Simatab, Superintendent. For services to Royal Papua New Guinea Constabulary.
- Warrick Simatab, Superintendent. For services to Royal Papua New Guinea Constabulary.
- Herman Soru, Senior Sergeant. For services to Royal Papua New Guinea Constabulary.
- Kieth Naikuli Tangui. For services to Morobe Provincial Administration – Education Division.
- David Terry, Inspector. For services to Royal Papua New Guinea Constabulary.
- Gaiwary Tinga, Superintendent. For distinguished services to Royal Papua New Guinea Constabulary.
- Tom Vali, Chief Sergeant. For services to Royal Papua New Guinea Constabulary.
- Robert Volo, Superintendent. For services to Royal Papua New Guinea Constabulary.
- Joseph Wasia, Sergeant. For services to Royal Papua New Guinea Constabulary.
- Michael Welly, Superintendent. For services to Royal Papua New Guinea Constabulary.

=== King's Police Medal (KPM) ===
King's Police Medal ribbon

- Samson Kua, Deputy Commissioner, Royal Papua New Guinea Constabulary.
- Kyle Saltmarsh, Chief Superintendent, Royal Papua New Guinea Constabulary.
- Julius Tasion, Assistant Commissioner, Royal Papua New Guinea Constabulary.

== Solomon Islands ==
Appointments made by The King on the advice of his ministers in the Solomon Islands.

=== Most Distinguished Order of St Michael and St George ===
Order of St Michael and St George ribbon

==== Companion of the Order of St Michael and St George (CMG) ====
- Lawrence Gilmore Pita Tanabose, Pastor. For services to the Seventh Day Adventist Church and Community locally, regionally and globally.

=== Most Excellent Order of the British Empire ===
Order of the British Empire ribbon (civil)

==== Officer of the Order of the British Empire (OBE) ====
Civil

- Leeanne Rose Panisi. For services to the area of Public Health and Clinical Services and Community.
- Silent Tovosia. For services to Education, Health Sector, Church Leadership and Community.

==== Member of the Order of the British Empire (MBE) ====
Civil

- Allan Ketei Siosi. For services to the field of Educational Excellence, Administration and Community Development.
- The Reverend Father Elison Vure Vahi. For services to the Anglican Church and Community.

=== British Empire Medal (BEM) ===
British Empire Medal ribbon (civil)

Civil

- Bettery Dick. For services to Workplace Environment, Hygiene, Volunteering and Community.
- Mathias Lenialu, Assistant Commissioner. For services to the Royal Solomon Islands Police Force and National Security.

=== King's Police Medal (KPM) ===
King's Police Medal ribbon

- Francis Ramoli. Chief Superintendent, Royal Solomon Islands Police.

== Tuvalu ==
Appointments made by The King on the advice of his ministers in Tuvalu.

=== Most Excellent Order of the British Empire ===
Order of the British Empire ribbon (civil)

==== Officer of the Order of the British Empire (OBE) ====
Civil

- Tenanoia Simona. For services to Telecommunications.

==== Member of the Order of the British Empire (MBE) ====
Civil

- Nelu Auega. For services to Sports and the Community.
- Temukisa Hauma. For services to Education and the Community.
- Leneuoti Matusi. For services to Tuvalu.

=== British Empire Medal (BEM) ===
British Empire Medal ribbon (civil)

Civil

- Pitaasi Faimalaga. For services to Education and to Gender Equality.
- Noa Felemeni. For services to Sports and Parasports.
- Pualeia Sitaake. For services to Cultural Heritage and to Gender Equality.

== Antigua and Barbuda ==
Appointments made by The King on the advice of his ministers in Antigua and Barbuda.

=== Most Excellent Order of the British Empire ===
Order of the British Empire ribbon (civil)

==== Officer of the Order of the British Empire (OBE) ====
Civil

- Janey Elizabeth Howell. For philanthropic service to Antigua and Barbuda and the wider Commonwealth.

==== Member of the Order of the British Empire (MBE) ====
Civil

- Gabriella Poppy Valentine Howell. For philanthropic service to Antigua and Barbuda and the wider Commonwealth.

=== King's Police Medal (KPM) ===
King's Police Medal ribbon

- Desmond Dinard, Assistant Commissioner, Police Force of Antigua and Barbuda.

== St Christopher and Nevis ==
Appointments made by The King on the advice of his ministers in St Christopher and Nevis.

=== Most Excellent Order of the British Empire ===
Order of the British Empire ribbon (civil)

==== Officer of the Order of the British Empire (OBE) ====
Civil

- John Emile Ferdinand, KC For services to National Development and the Law.

==== Member of the Order of the British Empire (MBE) ====
Civil

- Jonathan Winston Bass. For services to the Financial Sector.
- Winston Alphanso Skeete. For services to the Maritime Industry.
