= Yavari =

Yavari may refer to:

== People ==
- Alain Reza Yavari (1949–2015), French chemist and metallurgist
- Alireza Yavari (born 2000), Iranian swimmer
- Mahmoud Yavari (1939–2020), Iranian footballer

== Other uses ==
- Yavari (ship), a Peruvian steamship on Lake Titicaca
- Yavari, Iran, a village in Kermanshah Province
- Yavari District, Mariscal Ramón Castilla province, Peru
- Yavarí or Javary River, a tributary of the Amazon that forms the boundary between Brazil and Peru
