= Department of Materials Science and Metallurgy, University of Cambridge =

Department of the University of Cambridge

Coordinates: 52.2036°N 0.1201°E

Department of Materials Science and Metallurgy (DMSM)
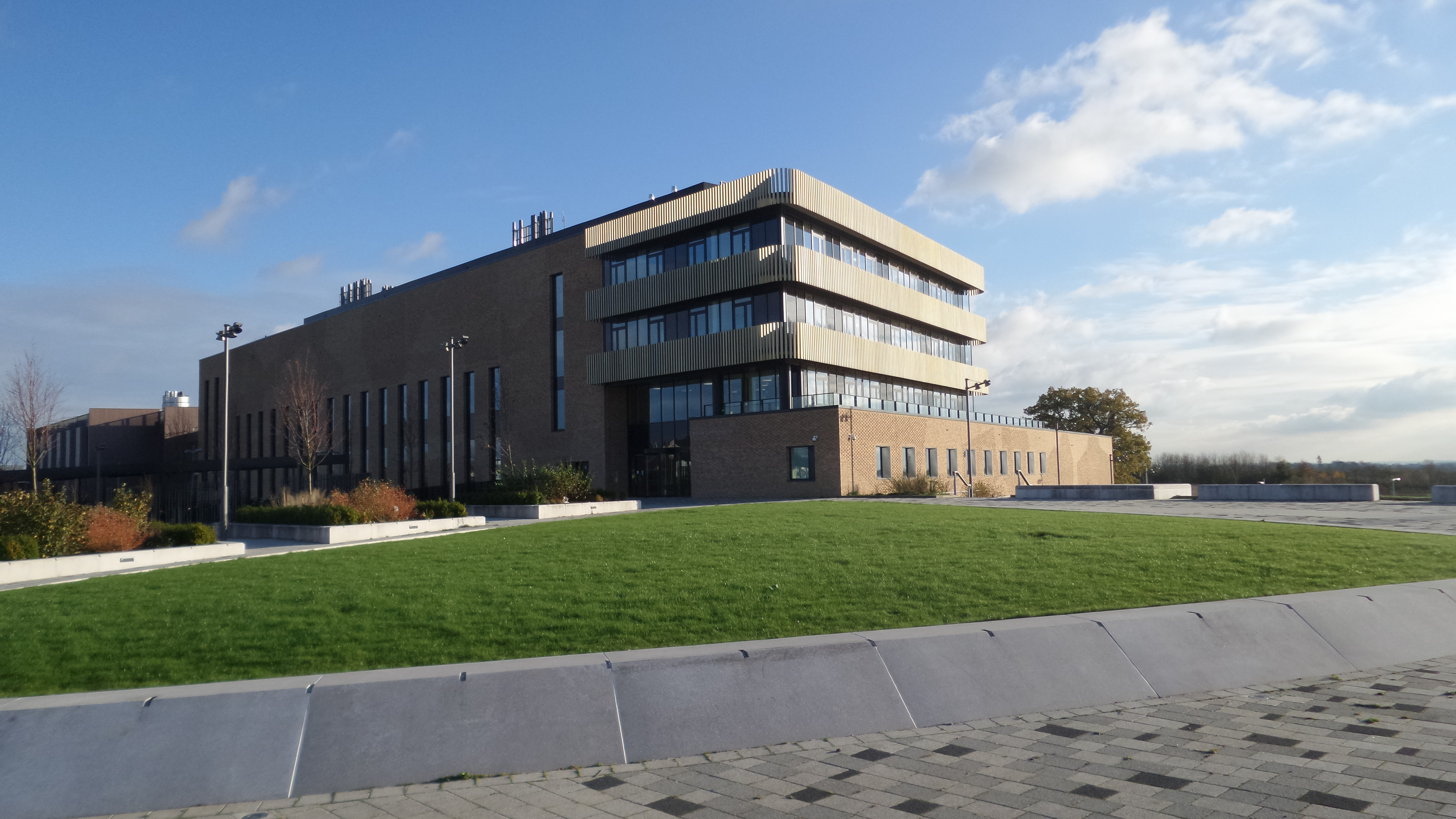
- 27 Charles Babbage Road, Cambridge, new site of MSM since 2013
- Affiliations: University of Cambridge
- Location: Cambridge, United Kingdom
- Website: www.msm.cam.ac.uk

The Department of Materials Science and Metallurgy (DMSM) is a large research and teaching division of the University of Cambridge. Since 2013 it has been located in West Cambridge, having previously occupied several buildings on the New Museums Site in the centre of Cambridge.

Following the changes to academic titles in 2021/2022 at the University of Cambridge, the academic staff of the Department of Materials Science and Metallurgy no longer use the academic titles of Reader and Lecturer. The list below reflects the new academic titles.

== Academic staff ==
As of October 2022 Professorial staff include:

1. Serena Best, CBE, FREng, Professor of Materials Science
2. Ruth Cameron, Professor of Materials Science
3. Manish Chhowalla, Goldsmiths' Professor of Materials Science
4. Judith Driscoll, FREng, Professor of Materials Science
5. Caterina Ducati, Professor of Nanomaterials
6. Rachel Evans, Professor of Materials Chemistry
7. James Elliott, Professor of Macromolecular Materials Science
8. A. Lindsay Greer, Professor of Materials Science
9. Louise Hirst, Professor of Materials Physics (jointly appointed with the Cavendish Laboratory)
10. Nick Jones, Professor of Metallurgy
11. Sohini Kar-Narayan, Professor of Device & Energy Materials
12. Neil Mathur, Professor of Materials Physics
13. Paul Midgley, FRS, Professor of Materials Science (Current Head of Department)
14. Rachel Oliver, FREng, Professor of Materials Science
15. Chris Pickard, Sir Alan Cottrell Professor of Materials Science
16. Cathie Rae, Professor of Superalloys
17. Emilie Ringe, Professor of Synthetic and Natural Nanomaterials (jointly appointed with the Department of Earth Sciences)
18. Howard Stone, Tata Steel Professor of Metallurgy
19. Jason WA Robinson, Professor of Materials Physics

== Heads of Department ==
1. R.S Hutton - 1944
2. Wesley Austin 1945-1958
3. Sir Alan Cottrell FRS 1958-1966
4. Sir Robert Honeycombe FREng FRS 1966-84
5. Derek Hull FREng FRS 1984-1991
6. Sir Colin Humphreys, CBE FREng FRS 1991-1996
7. Alan Windle FRS 1996-2000
8. Derek Fray FRS FREng 2000-2005
9. Alan Lindsay Greer 2005-2013
10. Mark Blamire 2013-2018
11. Paul Midgley FRS 2018-2020
12. Ruth Cameron, James Elliott, and Jason WA Robinson 2020-2005
13. Jason WA Robinson FIMMM 2025-

== Research themes ==
Current research spans seven themes in which there are current materials challenges to overcome:

1. Aerospace materials
2. Information Communication Technologies
3. Innovative Characterisation
4. Materials Discovery
5. Materials for Energy and Sustainability
6. Materials for Healthcare
7. Novel Design and Processing

== Research groups ==
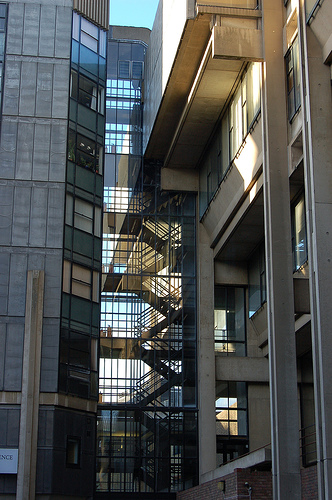
Stair Case of Arup Tower, part of the former site of MSM, at the New Museums Site, Pembroke Street, Cambridge.

Research is organised into the following groups.

- Device Materials Group
- Electron Microscopy Group
- Cambridge Centre for Gallium Nitride
- Hybrid Materials Group
- Macromolecular Materials Laboratory
- Centre for Materials Physics
- Materials Theory Group
- Cambridge Centre for Medical Materials
- Microstructural Kinetics Group
- Optical Nanomaterials Group
- Photoactive Materials Group
- Rolls-Royce University Technology Centre in Advanced Materials
- Space Voltaics Group

== Spinout companies ==
- 2019 - Barocal Ltd - developing new heating and cooling technologies to satisfy low-carbon requirements
- 2018 - Plastometrex Ltd - Profilometry-based Indentation Plastometry (PIP) - a revolutionary new approach to the mechanical testing of metals
- 2018 - Porotech - specialising in the development of Gallium Nitride material technology
- 2015 - Paragraf Ltd - novel deposition of graphene onto semiconductors
- 2010 - CamGaN (now part of Plessey) - GaN on Silicon LED technology (low cost, low energy lighting)
- 2007 - Inotec AMD - innovative topical oxygen therapy for wound healing
- 2004 - Q-flo (merged with Plasan, CNT fibres now commercialised by Tortech) - ultra-long CNT fibres
- 2004 - Camfridge - energy-efficient and gas-free magnetic cooling
- 2001 - Metalysis - commercialisation of the FFC Cambridge Process. Reduction of metal oxides and ores into pure metals and alloys
- 1989 - CMD Ltd (became part of Accelerys, now part of Biovia Dassault Systèmes) - X-ray modelling software

== Alumni and former staff ==
Notable alumni and former staff include:

- Sir Harry Bhadeshia FRS FREng
- Anthony Cheetham, FRS
- Alan Cottrell, FRS,
- Robert W. Cahn FRS,
- Robert Honeycombe
- Derek Fray FRS FREng
- Sir Colin Humphreys, CBE FREng FRS
- Alan Windle FRS
- Charles Heycock FRS
- Sir Graeme Davies FREng
- William Bonfield CBE FRS FREng
- Michael F. Ashby CBE FRS FREng
- Julia King, Baroness Brown of Cambridge DBE FREng

== See also ==
- DoITPoMS
- Department of Materials, University of Oxford
- Department of Materials, Imperial College London
