= Chen Zheng =

Chen Zheng may refer to:

- Chen Zheng (Tang dynasty) (616–677), Tang Dynasty general responsible for developing the city of Zhangzhou
- Xiao Yang (1929–1998), politician of the People's Republic of China
- George Chen, born Chen Zheng, materials science professor at University of Nottingham

== See also ==
- Zheng Chen (born 1965), Chinese sprinter, silver medalist in sprint at the Athletics at the 1990 Asian Games
