= Neil Mathur =

Neil Mathur may refer to:

- Neil D. Mathur, professor in materials physics at the University of Cambridge
- Neil Nitin Mukesh (born 1982 as Neil Nitin Mukesh Chand Mathur), Indian actor
