= Timothy A. Cross =

American chemist

Timothy A. Cross is an American academic chemist who specializes in nuclear magnetic resonance (NMR) spectroscopy, membrane and computational biophysics, and biomathematics. He is a professor of chemistry at Florida State University and the Director of the NMR Program at the National High Magnetic Field Laboratory. His research focuses on the sets of proteins that are important for the pharmaceutical industry in the treatment of diseases such as the flu (Influenza A) and tuberculosis.
