= Janice Musfeldt =

Researcher at Los Alamos National Laboratory

Janice Musfeldt is a professor at University of Tennessee, Knoxville in physical and materials chemistry and experimental physics. She received her B.S. degree in chemical engineering from the University of Illinois in 1987 and a Ph.D. in physical chemistry from the University of Florida in 1992. She served as a post-doctoral research associate at the Departement de Physique, Universite de Sherbrooke in 1993-1994. She received the 2001 Creativity award from the Division of Materials Research, National Science Foundation and the 2010 Chancellor's award for research and creative achievement at the University of Tennessee. She has served on the user committee of the National High Magnetic Field Laboratory between 2010 and 2013 and between 2018 and the present and was elected its chair in 2010. In 2014 she founded the biannual Gordon Research Conference on Multiferroics and Magnetoelectric materials. In 2017, she was elected as a Fellow of the American Physical Society for her contribution to the spectroscopy of quantum materials with an emphasis on high magnetic field effects in multiferroics, quantum magnets, and nanomaterials.
