= Laura Greene (physicist) =

American physics professor

Laura H. Greene
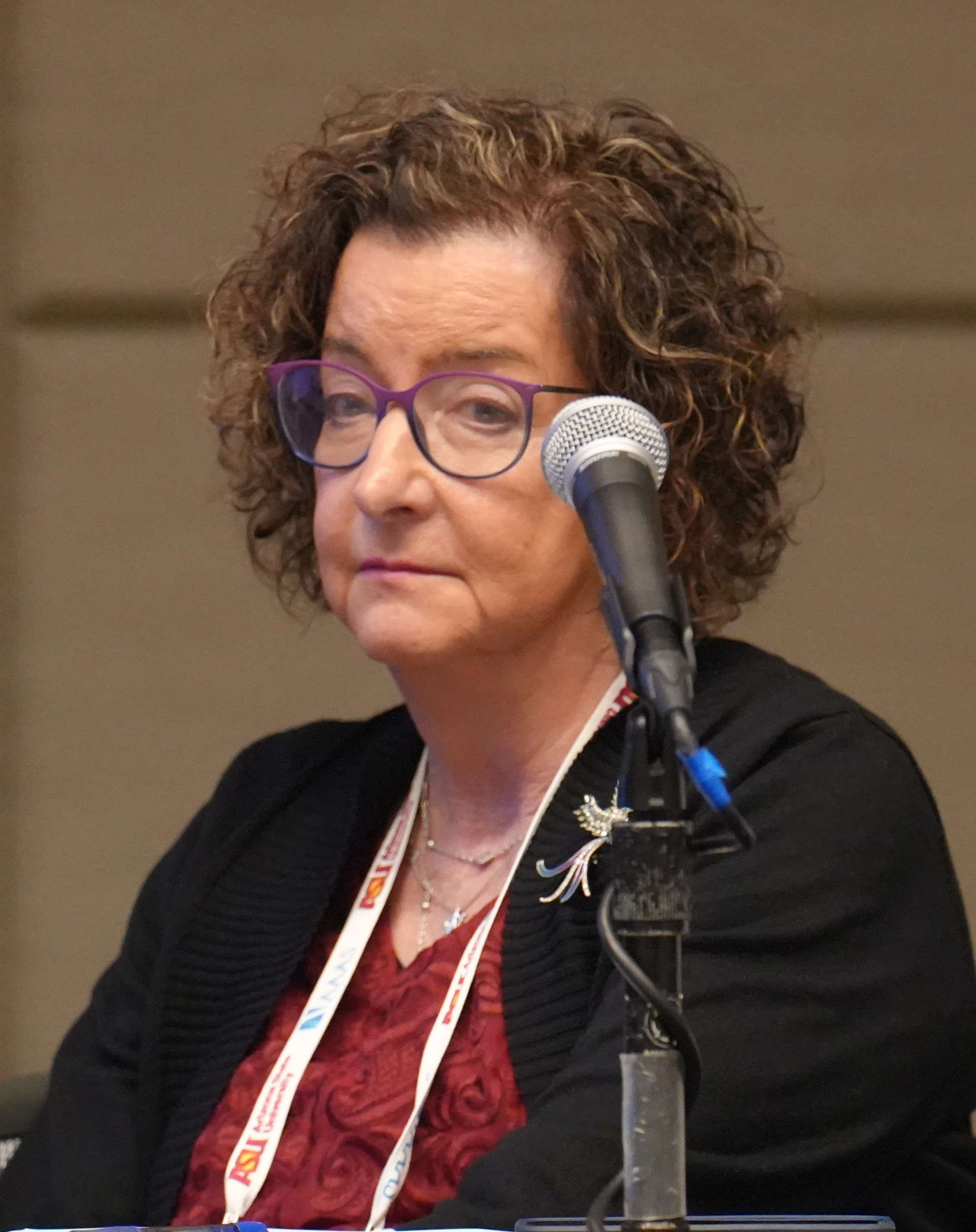
- Greene in 2026
- Education: Ohio State University (BS, MS); Cornell University (MS, PhD)
- Children: 2
- Scientific career
- Fields: Physics
- Workplaces: Florida State University; National High Magnetic Field Laboratory; University of Illinois at Urbana-Champaign

Laura H. Greene is the Marie Krafft Professor of Physics at Florida State University and chief scientist at the National High Magnetic Field Laboratory. She was previously a professor of physics at the University of Illinois at Urbana-Champaign. In September 2021, she was appointed to the President's Council of Advisors on Science and Technology (PCAST).

She is noted for her research on Andreev bound states and is an expert in strongly correlated fermionic systems. During the discoveries of the first high transition temperature superconductors she and collaborators from AT&T laboratories, were amongst the first to report on the role of oxygen and crystal structure in the copper-oxides.

Greene is a champion for diversity and is active in promoting equal rights for women and minorities. She is a member of the American Physical Society Professional Skills Development (previously COACh) team, a cohort of APS members who are trained to facilitate sessions that aim to strengthen women's communication, mentoring and negotiation skills in STEM fields.

== Biography ==
Greene grew up in Cleveland, Ohio.

Greene studied physics as an undergraduate at Ohio State University and was awarded a cum laude BS, (1974) degree and Master's (MS) in 1978. For higher education she joined Cornell University. At Cornell, first she was awarded a MS in experimental physics (1980) and then in (1984) she completed a PhD degree in condensed matter physics.

=== Career ===
With her PhD she joined the fabled AT&T Bell Labs in Murray Hills in New Jersey (NJ) and later Bellcore, Red Bank also in NJ.

The first ever evidence of, high-temperature superconductivity was reported (1986) by Georg Bednorz and K. Alex Müller, the two would obtain the Nobel Prize in Physics in 1987 for their discovery. Within months, the IBM report was followed up with discoveries of far higher temperature superconductors from all over the world and publicized by professional events, like the March meetings of the American Physical Society (APS) in 1987, also known the Woodstock of physics.

Greene and colleagues then still at AT&T discovered the sensitivity of the superconducting transition, in the 123 materials, to the exact amount of oxygen present, as well as the interdependence of atomic crystal structure and chemical composition with superconductivity. Greene's contribution was recognized in the first book review on the subject. Greene was also a panelist at the Woodstock-II in the follow-up APS March meeting in 1988.

From 1992 to 2015 she was a permanent member of the faculty of the University of Illinois at Urbana-Champaign (UIUC). At UIUC she held the Swanlund endowed chair professor of physics. Since 2015, she has been on the faculty at Florida State University (FSU) in the department of physics and chief scientist at the National High Magnetic Field Laboratory. She is also a member of the physics faculty at the University of Florida.

=== Personal life ===
Music was important in her life, she enjoys performing and is a regular participant in the APS March Meeting "Physics Songs" symposia. She is the mother of two grown up sons.

== Research ==
Greene research is centered around unconventional or novel superconducting materials, especially by Andreev reflection (PCAR) spectroscopy, demonstration of Andreev bound states, and a wide range of symmetry breaking phenomena, including time-reversal symmetry breaking. Her recent work include quantum mechanics on a macroscopic level, strongly correlated materials, PCAR experiments in Heavy fermion superconductor systems, and others.

== Outreach and societal awareness ==
Greene is committed to equal rights for women and minorities in education and in the work place, particularly when it comes to the hard sciences and the engineering professions; she also actively promotes awareness and sensitivity towards people who face difficult health challenges. She is a Co-founder of the Forum on Outreach and Engaging the Public (FOEP), and a member of Committee on Informing the Public, both parts of the American Physical Society. Greene was on 'BOOST/Grantwriting/Indonesia Advisory Board'; part of COACH International, for the Kavli Frontiers of Science Indonesia Meeting, Bali, Indonesia, and she has served on the Argonne Education and Outreach Council for the Division of Educational Programs, Argonne National Laboratory (Argonne-U/Chicago-LLC).

== Selected awards and honors ==
- American Physical Society Five Sigma Physicist Award for Advocacy in Science Policy, 2019.
- Tallahassee Scientific Society Gold Medal Award, 2019.
- President, American Physical Society, 2017 (Vice-Chair 2015, Chair-Elect 2016, Chair 2017, Past Chair 2018).
- Chair, Division of Materials Physics (DMP) of the American Physical Society, elected 2012 (Vice-Chair 2012; Chair-Elect 2013; Chair 2014; Past Chair 2015).
- US delegate to the Commission on Structure and Dynamics of Condensed Matter (C10), International Union of Pure and Applied Physicists (IUPAP), elected 2011 for a three-year term.
- U. S. Liaison Committee, International Union of Pure and Applied Physicists (IUPAP), elected 2011 for a three-year term.
- External Advisory Panel, Argonne Materials Advisory Board, 2010 – present.
- Co-chair (with R. L. Greene) of the ICAM International Working Group on New Superconductors, 2010 – present.
- Joseph S. Guggenheim Foundation Fellowship, 2009-10.
- Fellowship Selection Committee, Institute of Physics (IoP – UK), 2007 – present.
- The Board on Physics and Astronomy of the National Academy of Sciences (BPA-NAS), 2003–2006 and 2008–2014.
- Fellow, Institute of Physics, "FInstP", UK, elected 2007.
- Member, National Academy of Sciences, elected 2006.
- Founding member, board of trustees, board of governors, Institute for Complex and Adaptive Materials (ICAM), University of California, 1999 – present.
- Fellow, American Academy of Arts and Sciences, elected 1997.
- Fellow, The American Association for the Advancement of Science, elected 1996.
- Maria Goeppert-Mayer Award of the American Physical Society, 1994.
- Fellow, American Physical Society, elected 1993.
- Panelist, Woodstock of Physics-II, Triple-digit superconductivity in the Copper-oxide system, New Orleans, March 1988.

== Publications ==
- L. H. Greene, R. T. Warner, W. E. Moerner, A. J. Sievers and J. F. Figueira, "Passive mode locking of a TEA(CO2) laser with matrix-isolated SF6", Journal of the Optical Society of American 70, 640-641 (1980).
- L. H. Greene, D. B. Tanner and A. J. Epstein, "Optical properties of the cation- deficient platinum chain salt, K1.75Pt(CN)4•1.5H2O", Physical Review B 25, 1331-1339 (1982).
- L. H. Greene, W. L. Feldmann, J.-M. Rowell, B. Batlogg, E. M. Gyorgy, W. P. Lowe and D. B. McWhan, "Structural, magnetic and superconducting properties of rare-earth/superconductor multilayer films", Superlattices and Microstructures, 1, 407-415 (1985).
- L. H. Greene, W. L. Feldmann and J.-M. Rowell, "Proximity-effect studies of Nb-based bilayers with s-p, rare-earth and heavy-fermion metals", Physica B 135, 77-80 (1985).
- J.-M. Tarascon, L. H. Greene, W. R. McKinnon, G. W. Hull and T. H. Geballe, "Superconductivity at 40K in the Oxygen-Defect Perovskites La2-xSrxCuO4-y", Science 235, 1373-1376 (1987).
- J. M. Tarascon, W. R. McKinnon, L. H. Greene, G. W. Hull, B. G. Bagley, E. M. Vogel and Y. LePage, "Oxygen Doping of the High Tc Superconducting Perovskites" in High Temperature Superconductors, D. V. Gubser and M. Schluter, eds., (Materials Research Society, Pittsburgh, PA 1987) pp. 65–67.
- J.-M. Tarascon, P. Barboux, L. H. Greene, G. W. Hull and B. G. Bagley, "3d-Metal Doping (Fe, Co, Ni, Zn) of the High Tc Perovskite YBa2Cu3O7-y", in High Temperature Superconductors, M. N. Brodsky, R. C. Dynes, H. L. Tuller and K. Kitazawa, eds., (Materials Research Society, Pittsburgh, PA, 1988) pp. 523–526.
- L. H. Greene, J.-M. Tarascon, P. F. Miceli, B. G. Bagley, P. Barboux, M. Giroud, G. W. Hull, Y. LePage, W. R. McKinnon, J. J. Rhyne and D. A. Neumann, "Recent Magnetic and Structural Studies of the High-Tc Cuprates at Bellcore", in Proceedings for SC-GLOBAL-89; International Superconductor Applications Convention, San Francisco, CA, V. Nurenberg, ed., January 11–13, 1989.
- L. H. Greene, A. Kastalsky, J. B. Barner and R. Bhat, "Superconductive Proximity-Effects in Nb on InGaAs-Based Heterostructures", Physica B 165-166, 1573-1574 (1990).
- L. H. Greene, M. Covington, M. Aprili, E. Paraoanu, "Tunneling into Andreev Bound States of YBa2Cu3O7: Observation of Broken Time-Reversal Symmetry", The Journal of Physics and Chemistry of Solids, 59, 2021-2025, (1998).
- H. Aubin, L. H. Greene, S. Jian and D. G. Hinks, "Andreev Bound States at the Onset of Phase Coherence in Bi2Sr2CaCu2O8", Physical Review Letters, 89, 177001-177004 (2002).
- L. H. Greene, "Data Dips and Peaks", Physics Today 58, 58 (2005).
- Laura H. Greene, "'Key issues' articles in Reports on Progress in Physics", Reports on Progress in Physics 70, 1 (2007).
- Laura H. Greene, "Taming Serendipity", Physics World, 24, 41-43 (2011).
- Laura H. Greene, Hamood Z. Arham, Cassandra R. Hunt, and Wan Kyu Park, "Design of new superconducting materials, and point contact spectroscopy as a probe of strong electronic correlations", Journal of Superconductivity and Novel Magnetism 25, 2121-2126 (2012).
