= Split magnet =

A Split Magnet is a resistive electromagnet that is separated into two halves, with the small gap that divides the two sides allowing access to a strong magnetic field. The combination of an accessible gap and strong magnetic field allows for the research of how far-infrared particles scatter. In addition, the magnet can also rotate up to 90°, allowing for the magnet to become parallel to the floor. The magnet uses a combination of 28 MW, a current of 160,000 amps and 13380 liters of water (for cooling purposes) per minute used. The strongest (and only) split helix magnet in the world is currently located in Florida State University at the National High Magnetic Field Laboratory, and can generate a field of 25 tesla.

== Applications ==
The magnet is well suited for studies into far-infrared scattering experiments, allowing for insight into the properties of certain materials. This includes the material's electronic structure, which determines its usefulness in electronics. This information can be used to further the development of smaller, more efficient computers.

However, the magnet is not limited to just infrared scattering experiments and can be used for much more, such as Fourier-transform infrared spectroscopy and Electron paramagnetic resonance. These techniques allow for a greater understanding of different materials, with applications ranging from analysis of biological compounds to microscopic imaging.

As recently as 2019, an additional function has been added to the magnet, an "Ultrafast Time-Domain Spectrometer". This spectrometer can withstand the 25 tesla magnetic fields produced by the magnet and allows for precise control over the material's charge, lattice, orbital, and spin degrees of freedom. This is especially useful for two dimensional materials (such as semiconductor wafers), as the spectrometer can analyze them in time frames around 200 femtoseconds, which is significantly shorter than what traditional systems use.

== Development ==
The concept of the magnet began in 2005 as a request for a resistive magnet that could operate from 25-30 tesla with a split down the middle to give more access during experiments and research. Development of the device took place at the National High Magnetic Field Laboratory and took approximately 4 years to build, with prototypes being tested in 2007. To facilitate this design the team behind the magnet developed a new kind of component, the "Split Florida-Helix", to help deal with the immense stress and pressure the vacuum and magnet apply on the structure. The Split Florida-Helix is a unique component of the magnet that allows for an open vacuum space to exist in the magnet. Normally, only conductive material and water cooling tubes would be present in the area where the Split Florida-Helix resides, but because of the special design over 50% of this space is now opened up for access, while still being able to account for the various forces and torques that would be applied. The magnet itself consists of 5 coils, 2 of which are connected in series, and 3 in parallel, which results in the 160kA current being split 4 ways, allowing for optimal division of stress.
