= Kathleen Amm =

American physicist

Kathleen M. Amm

Director of National High Magnetic Field Laboratory
- Incumbent
- Assumed office May 6, 2024
- Preceded by: Greg Boebinger

Personal details
- Born: Kathleen Melanie Todd; September 15, 1971 (age 54) Boston, Massachusetts
- Spouse: Lucio da Silva
- Children: 2
Website
https://nationalmaglab.org/
Kathleen Amm
- Scientific career
- Thesis: [. "Synthesis and Properties of Mercury Cuprate Superconductors with Metallic Interfaces"] (1998)
- Doctoral advisor: Justin Schwartz & Jack Crow

Kathleen M. Amm is an American physicist who is director of the National High Magnetic Field Laboratory with facilities in Tallahassee, Gainesville and Los Alamos.

== Life and education ==
Amm was born September 15, 1971, in Boston, Massachusetts. She did her undergraduate work at the University of Toronto with a Bachelor of Science in Mathematics and Physics in 1993. She received her Ph.D. in 1998 from Florida State University in Condensed Matter Physics, working with the National MagLab’s founding director, Jack Crow, as one of her advisors.

== Career ==
Amm started her career as a physicist in the electromagnetic and superconductivity lab at GE Aerospace Research. Throughout her 20-year tenure with the company, she led groups in the Superconductivity and Electromagnetics Laboratory and the MRI Technologies and Systems Laboratory. She directed the Magnetics Division at Brookhaven National Laboratory (BNL) in New York for almost six years. In May 2024, she joined the National High Magnetic Field Laboratory as director. She oversees facilities at Florida State University, the University of Florida and the Los Alamos National Laboratory. She has contributed to over 75 publications and 22 patents throughout her career.

== Awards & honors ==
- GE Global Research Award - breakthrough magnet technologies (2014)
- New York State Superconductivity Leader (2011)
- Management Award - Global Project Management on the Eagle Project (2004)
- Management Award - Leadership in Project Management project (2001)
- Best Paper Award in Structural Materials - International Cryogenic Materials Conference (1999)
- Student Meritorious Paper Award - International Cryogenic Materials Conference (1997)
- Finalist - Materials Research Society Graduate Student Award (1997)

== Professional memberships ==
Amm has membership in the Institute of Electrical and Electronics Engineers and other professional societies.
