= Lindsay Greer =

British materials scientist

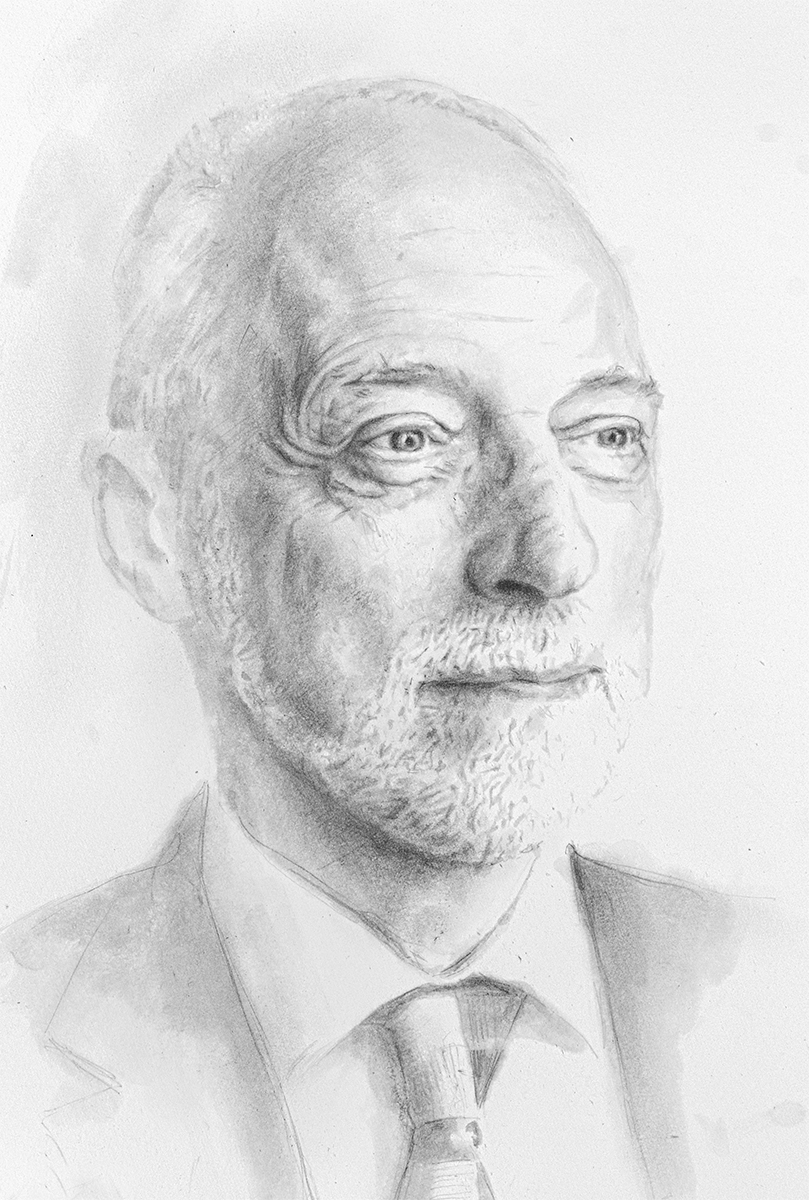
- Born: Alan Lindsay Greer
- Education: University of Cambridge
- Known for: Metallic glasses; crystal nucleation; grain refinement
- Scientific career
- Fields: Materials science
- Workplaces: University of Cambridge; Harvard University
- Doctoral advisor: John Leake
- Doctoral students: Alice Bunn

Alan Lindsay Greer (publishing as A. Lindsay Greer) is a British materials scientist and professor at the University of Cambridge, known for research on metallic glasses, crystal nucleation and microstructural kinetics. He served as Head of the Department of Materials Science and Metallurgy from 2006 to 2013 and as Head of the School of the Physical Sciences from 2016 to 2019. Since 2024 he has been President of the Cambridge Philosophical Society. He is also a professor and Director of Studies for Material Sciences at Sidney Sussex College, Cambridge.

== Early life and education ==
Greer studied at Trinity Hall, University of Cambridge, where he earned the MA and PhD degrees. His doctoral research was supervised by John Leake. He subsequently held postdoctoral and faculty appointments at Harvard University before returning to Cambridge.

== Career ==
At Cambridge, Greer’s roles have included Head of the Department of Materials Science & Metallurgy (2006–2013) and Head of the School of the Physical Sciences (2016–2019). As Head of the School of the Physical Sciences (2016–2019), Greer oversaw several Cambridge departments, including Physics, Chemistry, Earth Sciences, and Applied Mathematics and Theoretical Physics. He initiated the Cambridge Nuclear Energy Centre and served as its inaugural chair. He is also an editor of Philosophical Magazine.

== Research ==
Greer’s research focuses on metallic materials far from equilibrium, including metallic glasses, thin-film multilayers and kinetic analysis of phase transformations. His publications include widely cited overviews of metallic glasses in Science (1995) and Materials Today (2009). His work has been covered in independent science media, including Physics World, which reported on strain-hardening metallic glasses in 2020.

== Awards and honours ==
- 2009 A. A. Griffith Medal and Prize, Institute of Materials, Minerals and Mining (IOM3)
- 2012 Bruce Chalmers Award, The Minerals, Metals & Materials Society (TMS)
- 2018 John Hunt Medal (IOM3).
- Hume Rothery Prize and Cook-Ablett Award (IOM3); Honda Kotaro Memorial Medal (Tohoku University); Lee Hsun Lecture Award (Chinese Academy of Sciences); Leibniz Medal (IFW Dresden); ISMANAM Senior Scientist Medal

== Selected publications ==
- A. L. Greer (1995). “Metallic Glasses.” Science 267 (5206): 1947–1953. doi:10.1126/science.267.5206.1947.
- A. Lindsay Greer (2009). “Metallic glasses… on the threshold.” Materials Today 12 (1–2): 14–22. doi:10.1016/S1369-7021(09)70037-9.
- K. F. Kelton; A. L. Greer (2010). Nucleation in Condensed Matter: Applications in Materials and Biology. Elsevier. ISBN 978-0-08-042147-6.

== Offices and service ==
- President, Cambridge Philosophical Society (2024–2026). The Society, founded in 1819, has had presidents including J. J. Thomson, Ernest Rutherford, and Paul Dirac.
- Editor, Philosophical Magazine.
