= Journal of Superconductivity and Novel Magnetism =

- Discipline: Superconductivity, magnetism, materials science
- Language: English
- Edited by: Jason WA Robinson

Publication details
- Former name(s): Journal of Superconductivity: Incorporating Novel Magnetism (1988–2005)
- History: 1988-present
- Publisher: Springer
- Frequency: Monthly
- Impact factor: 1.7 (2024)

Standard abbreviations
- ISO 4: J. Supercond. Novel Magn.

Indexing
- CODEN: JSNMBN
- ISSN: 1557-1939 (print); 1557-1947 (web)

Links
- Journal homepage; Online access; Online archive

The Journal of Superconductivity and Novel Magnetism is a peer-reviewed scientific journal published monthly by Springer Science+Business Media. Established in 1988 under the title Journal of Superconductivity: Incorporating Novel Magnetism, it was renamed to its current title in 2005. It covers developments in the science and technology of superconductivity and magnetism, including novel materials, mechanisms and applications. Its current editor-in-chief is Jason WA Robinson (University of Cambridge).

== Abstracting and indexing ==
The journal is abstracted and indexed in:

- Chemical Abstracts Core
- Current Contents/Physical, Chemical & Earth Sciences
- EBSCO databases
- Ei Compendex
- Inspec
- Science Citation Index Expanded
- Scopus

According to the Journal Citation Reports, the journal has a 2024 impact factor of 1.7.
