= Carol Homden =

Charity chief executive

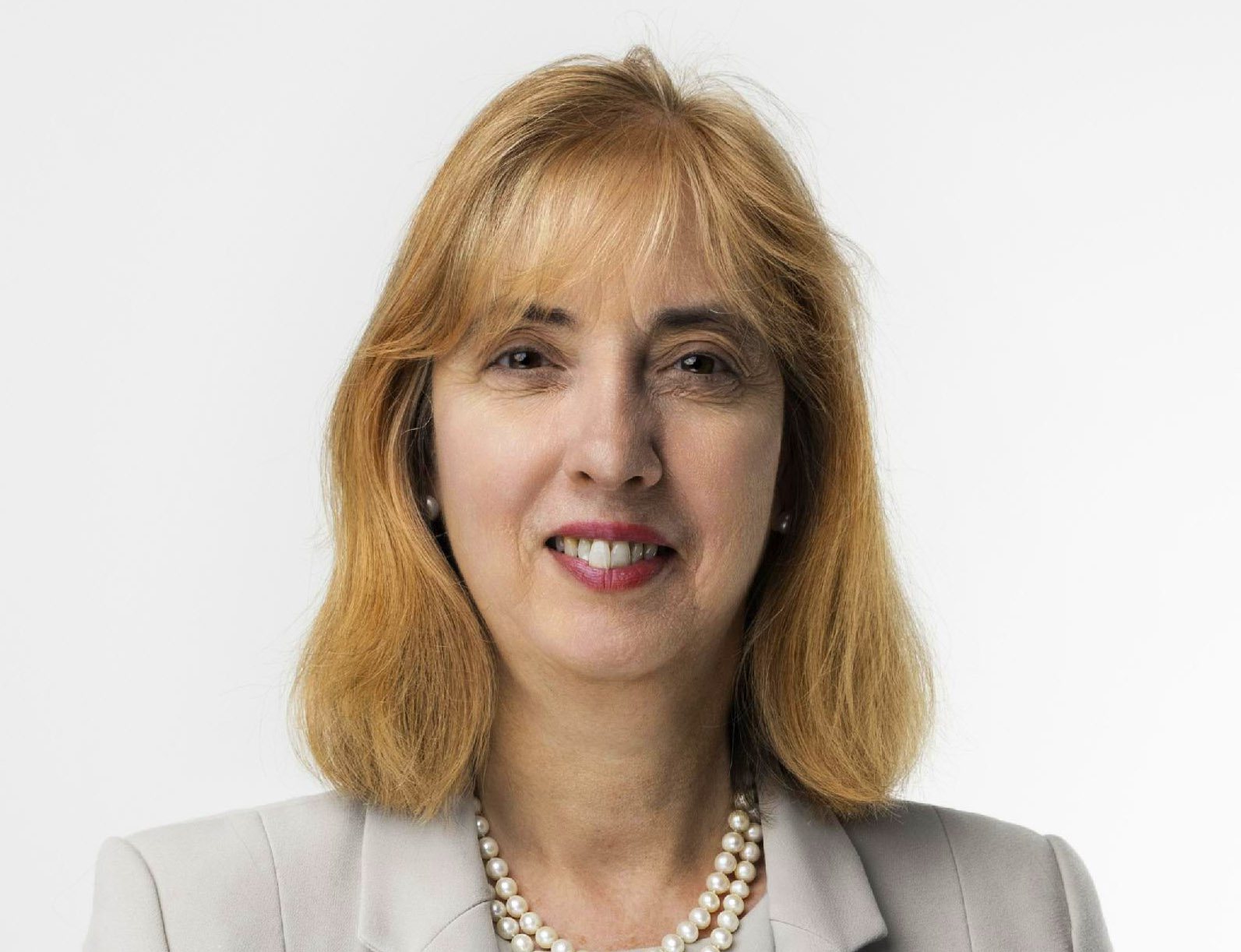
Carol Homden

Dame Carol Ann Homden DBE (born 9 April 1960) is Chief Executive of the Thomas Coram Foundation for Children (known as Coram), the first and longest-continuing children's charity. She is also Chair of the board of Diabetes UK. and a trustee of the Association for Child and Adolescent Mental Health (ACAMH).

== Early life and education ==
Homden was born in Shrewsbury, Shropshire to Dick and Beryl (née Kinnersley) Homden. Dick Homden was managing director of Salop Design, a tool pressings business he had founded in 1960. He served as director of Walsall FC and Birmingham City FC, before becoming chairman of Wolverhampton Wanderers FC.

Carol Homden attended Shrewsbury High School from 1964 to 1978, where she was elected head girl. In 1978 she attended the University of East Anglia, graduating with a 2:1 in English Literature. Her doctoral thesis (1986) was published by Cambridge University Press as The Plays of David Hare.

== Career ==
In 1985, Homden joined the Polytechnic of North London (PNL) as Public Relations Officer. She left to join the Polytechnic of Central London (PCL) in 1987 as Director of Corporate Communications, later becoming its Director of Marketing and Development. It was during her tenure that she oversaw its rebranding from Polytechnic to become the University of Westminster. She was also the Coordinator of the Coalition of Modern Universities.

In 1999, she became Commercial Director at the British Museum, where she oversaw the launch of the Great Court. In 2003 Homden joined the Prince's Trust as Commercial Director. She joined the Thomas Coram Foundation for Children as Chief Executive in 2007.

== Professional development ==
Homden was Chair of the Avenues Trust from 2005–2010, and Chair of the National Autistic Society from 2011–2021. She served on the Youth Justice Board for England and Wales from 2014–17. She drove the amalgamation of multiple organisations to form the Coram Group, raising their turnover from £6.5m to over £25m. She has also led the development of the Coram Institute for Children, which was recognised as an Independent Research Organisation in 2025

== Awards ==
Homden was awarded Commander of the Order of the British Empire (CBE) in 2013, for services to children and families, and was elevated to Dame Commander of the Order of the British Empire (DBE) in the 2026 New Year Honours.
