= Catherine Rae =

British metallurgist

Cathie Rae FIMMM
- Born: Catherine Mary Fiona Rae
- Education: University of Oxford (MA, DPhil)
- Scientific career
- Fields: Metallurgy; Microstructural Characterisation; Materials science Nickel-based superalloys
- Workplaces: University of Cambridge; Open University; University of East Anglia
- Thesis: Grain boundary migration (1982)
- Doctoral advisor: David A Smith
- Website: www.rrutc.msm.cam.ac.uk/directory/cathie-rae

Catherine Mary Fiona Rae FIMMM is a Professor of Superalloys in the Department of Materials at the University of Cambridge. Rae is the Director of the Rolls-Royce UTC in Cambridge. She is known for her expertise in electron microscopy and the behaviour of materials in aerospace applications.

== Education ==
Rae became interested in science when accompanying her father on field work visits to sub-Saharan Africa and the space race between the US and USSR. This motivated her application to University, where Rae was one of the first female students to study in St Catherine's College, Oxford (as it was previously an all-male college) and was a college scholar. In 1974, she completed her degree and received a First in Metallurgy and the Science of Materials. Rae completed her Doctor of Philosophy degree on grain boundary migration supervised by David A Smith and Peter Hazeldine.

== Research and career ==
After her studies in the University of Oxford, Rae moved to Girton College, Cambridge to become a Rolls-Royce Research Fellow. This began her association with Rolls-Royce Holdings and her work in superalloys. In 1972, Rae received a University Fellowship sponsored by Rolls-Royce which she used to fund her research full-time for three years and part-time for two years after the birth of her son.

Rae took time out of research for the birth of, and to raise, her first daughter, and this was extended by the birth of her second daughter and the recession. In this period, Rae taught for the Open University and developed a Science Foundation course at the University of East Anglia (UEA) which was established to enable those with GCE Advanced Level qualifications to gain entry to University.

After this eight-year break, Rae rejoined the University of Cambridge and earned a lectureship position in the Department of Materials Science and Metallurgy and a teaching fellowship at Emmanuel College, Cambridge in 2002. In 2009, Rae was awarded an Industrial Fellowship hosted by Rolls-Royce plc and provided her with direct view of the workings of the company.

Rae is well known for her work on superalloys, including understanding the mechanical properties and microstructure formation, as well as the development of single crystal superalloy blade systems including the application of the thermal barrier coating. She is an expert in transmission electron microscopy. Rae holds multiple patents for significant advances in materials for gas turbine engines.

=== Professional service ===
In 2014, Rae was on the Programme Committee for EuroSuperalloys 2014, a major conference in superalloys research. Rae has served on the Royal Society Committee for Science, Industry and Translation. She is Director of the Rolls-Royce Strategic Training Partnership which was nominated for the Times Higher Education Awards in 2017 for the "Most Innovative Contribution to Business-University Collaboration". Rae is also serves as a member of the "Structure and Properties of Materials Committee" for the Institute of Materials, Minerals and Mining. In 2018 she led the Rolls-Royce UTC's presentation of "Engineering Atoms" at the Royal Society Summer Exhibition. Rae acts as Senior Advisor for the start-up "OxMet" founded by Roger Reed.

=== Public service ===
In the 2021 United Kingdom local elections Rae was elected as a Labour Party councilor for Cambridgeshire County Council, representing the Castle ward in Cambridge. Previously, in 2018 Rae had unsuccessfully run for councillor for the Fen Ditton and Fulbourn Ward of South Cambridgeshire District Council as a Labour Party Councillor.

== Selected Academic Publications ==
- Rae, Catherine MF, and Roger C. Reed. "The precipitation of topologically close-packed phases in rhenium-containing superalloys." Acta materialia 49.19 (2001): 4113-4125.
- Freund, Lisa P., et al. "Segregation assisted microtwinning during creep of a polycrystalline L12-hardened Co-base superalloy." Acta Materialia 123 (2017): 295-304.
- Bensch, Matthias, et al. "Influence of oxidation on near-surface γ′ fraction and resulting creep behaviour of single crystal Ni-base superalloy M247LC SX." Materials Science and Engineering: A 577 (2013): 179-188.
- Pang, Hon Tong, et al. "Solution heat treatment optimization of fourth-generation single-crystal nickel-base superalloys." Metallurgical and Materials Transactions A 43.9 (2012): 3264-3282.
