= Shrewsbury High School, Shropshire =

Shrewsbury High School

Location
- 32 Town Walls; Shrewsbury, Shropshire, SY1 1TN; England; 52.705°N 2.757°W

Information
- Type: Private day school
- Established: 1885
- Local authority: Shropshire
- Head: Darren Payne
- Gender: Co-educational
- Age: 4 to 18
- Houses: 4
- Website: http://www.shrewsburyhigh.co.uk/

Shrewsbury High School is a co-educational private day school for girls from ages 4 – 18, with (from September 2026) boys entering in years 7 and 12, in Shrewsbury, Shropshire

== History ==
Shrewsbury High School opened as a day school for girls in 1885. In 1893 the rising star Ethel Gavin took over as head. The school had outgrown its site and it moved to its present location on the banks of the River Severn in central Shrewsbury in 1895. Gavin moved on to another headship in 1897. The junior department transferred to Kennedy Road in 1959. In 2008 a new prep school was formed by the merger of the existing junior department with Kingsland Grange, a boys' prep school. The junior department has moved to the Town Walls campus.

The senior department is on Town Walls, by the banks of the River Severn.

== Notable former pupils ==
- Lois Baxter, actress
- Mary Beard, classicist
- Alice Bunn, director of UK Space Agency
- Carol Homden, charity chief executive
- Hilda Murrell, horticulturalist and activist
