= Alain Reza Yavari =

French chemistry and physical metallurgy scholar

A. Reza Yavari
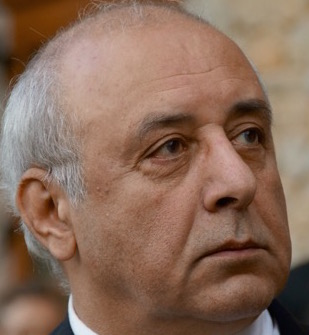
- Born: 15 December 1949; Tehran, Iran
- Died: 24 November 2015 (aged 65); Auxerre, France
- Education: Massachusetts Institute of Technology; Stanford University; Harvard University
- Scientific career
- Fields: Physical Chemistry

Alain Reza Yavari (15 December 1949 – 24 November 2015) was a French scholar in the fields of chemical and physical metallurgy, with a focus on bulk metallic glasses. His transdisciplinary approach across physics and chemistry led to remarkable innovations that contributed to significant breakthroughs in both fundamental and applied material sciences.

== Biography ==
Born in Tehran in 1949, he moved to France at the age of 15 and attended the American College in Paris. He was enrolled as an undergraduate at the Massachusetts Institute of Technology (B.Sc.) at the age of 17. He later continued his M.Sc. at Stanford University and completed a Ph.D. at Harvard University under the supervision of Prof Turnbull.

Alain Reza Yavari moved back to France and joined the French National Center for Scientific Research. He finished his career as Research Director of Exceptional Class (DRCE, the highest level), leading a research group with numerous international collaborations, notably with Japan and Brazil. His numerous publications include several academic books and 305 highly cited papers in major international journals such as Nature, Science and Nature Materials.

He was married to Isabelle Moulin (1985–1998) and was the father of two sons, Rostaim and Keihann Yavari, who both live in France.

Professor Yavari died at the age of 65 on 24 November 2015.

== Scientific work ==
Alain Reza Yavari led a team working on metastable and nanocrystalline materials in Grenoble. He has served as senior scientist at the corporate headquarters of AlliedSignal (where he trained in Management and Re-engineering) and as Invited Professor at the University of Complutense (Madrid), at Kyoto University in Japan and Tohoku University in Japan.

He has served as editor-in-chief of the Journal of Metastable and Nanocryst. Mater. (Trans Tech), Associate Editor of Materials Transactions JIM and was on the editorial or steering committees of various scientific periodicals and international conference series.

He has authored more than 300 scientific papers, edited 7 books, holds 7 patents, has managed tens of industrial contracts, more than 20 doctoral theses, many European SCIENCE or HCM and RTN -type contracts, organised or co-organised 14 international conferences including a series of three with the late Peter Haasen.

He was one of the distinguished founders and a long-standing Chairman of the Steering Committee of the International Symposium on Metastable, Amorphous and Nanostructured Materials (ISMANAM) created in 1994 (Grenoble). Since then, it is organized worldwide with more than 400 scientists participating annually.

He was recently Coordinator of an EU Research and Training Network on metallic glasses and a French National ANR project on the same subject.

== Noticeable papers ==
- “Mechanically driven alloying of immiscible elements”, Physical Review Letters. 68, 1992, pp. 2235–2238
- “Cobalt-based bulk glassy alloy with ultrahigh strength and soft magnetic properties”, Nature Materials. 2, (2003) pp. 661–663
- “Solving the Hume-Rothery Eutectic Puzzle using Miracle Glasses”,Nature Materials. 4, (2005) pp. 1–2
- “Unusual room-temperature compressive plasticity in nanocrystal-toughened bulk copper-zirconium glass” Philosophical Magazine Letters. 85 (2005) pp. 221–229
- “Materials science – A new order for metallic glasses”, Nature. 439 (2006) pp. 405–406
- “The changing faces of disorder”, Nature Materials. 6 (2007) pp. 181–182
- “Direct observation of local atomic order in a metallic glass”, Nature Materials. 10 (2011) pp. 28–33
- “Geometric Frustration of Icosahedron in Metallic Glasses” Science, 341 (2013) pp. 376–379

== Membership of societies ==
- Materials Research Society MRS (USA)
- Japan Institute of Metals
- Société Française de Métallurgie
- European Materials Research Society (E-MRS)
- Réseau Français de Mécanosynthèse (co-founder)

== Distinctions ==
- Bétancourt-Perronet Prize of the French and Spanish Academies of Sciences, 1995
- ISMANAM Gold Medal, (Rome) 1996
- NEDO International grant, 1997 (Japan) (with Pr A. Inoue Tohoku University, Pr K. Hono and Pr A. L. Greer, Cambridge)
- International Copper Association best project 2005 grant, (with Pr A. Inoue Tohoku University and Pr A. L. Greer, Cambridge)
- Honda Kotaro Memorial Prize, 2006 Medal, (Ceremony in Ecole Centrale de Lyon in 2007)
