= Caterina Ducati =

Italian materials scientist

- Born: Milan
- Education: University of Milan; University of Cambridge
- Known for: Electrochemistry; Nanomaterials
- Scientific career
- Workplaces: University of Cambridge

Caterina Ducati is an Italian materials scientist. She is a Professor of Nanomaterials in the Department of Materials at the University of Cambridge. She serves as Director of the University of Cambridge Master's programme in Micro- and Nanotechnology Enterprise as well as leading teaching in the Nanotechnology Doctoral Training Centre.

== Early life and education ==
Ducati was born in Milan. She studied at the University of Milan, where she earned an undergraduate degree in physics. Her research project involved designing a time-of-flight mass spectrometer for supersonic cluster beams under the supervision of Paolo Milani. She moved to the University of Cambridge Department of Engineering for her graduate studies, where she worked with John Robertson. Her doctorate considered nanostructured carbon for electrochemistry as well as the relationship between morphology, crystallographic phases and electronic properties in nanomaterials. This included the development of carbon nanotubes and investigations into their growth models using transmission electron microscopy.

== Research and career ==
In 2003, Ducati was awarded a Knowledge Transfer Partnership fellowship working on the 4151 programme with Alphasense Limited. In 2004, she was made a Royal Society Dorothy Hodgkin fellow, where she started to research metal oxide nanostructures for catalysis. She was simultaneously awarded a Sackler junior fellowship. She was subsequently awarded a Royal Society University Research Fellowship to explore electron microscopy of nanostructures, and was based in Churchill College, Cambridge. This involved developing transmission electron microscopy to study the nanoscale properties of solar cells, which allows better understanding of how electrons move through a structured anode.

In 2009, Ducati was made a lecturer in the Department of Materials at the University of Cambridge. She researches the degradation of nanostructured solar cells, and lithium-ion batteries in collaboration with Paul Midgley and Clare Grey. She was awarded a European Research Council Starting Grant to study photoactive nanomaterials and devices, and a Proof of Concept grant to study metal – metal oxide nanocomposites for air purification. She was elected to AcademiaNet in 2011. Ducati has worked with the Institute of Physics Electron Microscopy and Analysis group and the Nanoscale Physics and Technology Group. She worked with Rachel Oliver on the delivery of Master's course in Micro- & Nanotechnology Enterprise.

She was promoted to Professor of Nanomaterials in 2019 and serves as Tutor and Director of Studies of Materials Science in Trinity College, Cambridge. She has led activities at Trinity to improve the representation of women scientists.

=== Awards ===
In 2018, Ducati was awarded the Royal Microscopical Society Medal for Innovation in Applied Microscopy for Engineering and Physical Sciences.

== Personal life ==
Ducati has two sons born in 2003 and 2007.
