= Derek Fray =

British material scientist

Derek Fray FRS FRSC FREng FIMMM
- Born: Derek John Fray; 26 December 1939 (age 86)
- Education: Emanuel School; Imperial College London (BSc, PhD)
- Awards: Beilby Medal and Prize (1981)
- Scientific career
- Fields: Materials Science
- Workplaces: University of Cambridge
- Thesis: The conductance of molten salts at constant volume (1965)
- Website: www.energy.cam.ac.uk/directory/djf25@cam.ac.uk

Derek John Fray (born 26 December 1939) is a British material scientist, and professor at the University of Cambridge.

== Education ==
Fray was educated at Emanuel School, and earned a Bachelor of Science degree followed by a PhD from Imperial College London.

== Career and research ==
He was Professor of Material Chemistry and a Director of Research from 1996 to 2014 at the Department of Materials Science and Metallurgy, University of Cambridge. Since 2015 he has held the title of a Distinguished Research Fellow and Emeritus Professor of Materials Chemistry in the Department of Materials Science and Metallurgy, University of Cambridge

Derek Fray is the main inventor of the FFC Cambridge process for the direct electrochemical reduction of metal oxides to metals and alloys along with co-inventors Tom Farthing and George Chen. The FFC Cambridge process has been commercialised by the Cambridge spin out company Metalysis, a company based in South Yorkshire.

He has published more than 450 papers and is cited as an inventor on 350 published patents. Several of these patents have been licensed to university spin-out companies of which he is a founding Director, including Metalysis, EMC, Camfridge, Chinuka and InotecAMD.

Fray is also a consultant to Verde Potash Plc, and White Mountain Titanium Corporation.

=== Awards and honours ===
Fray was awarded the Beilby Medal and Prize in 1981. A symposium was held in his name in 2011. Additionally, the award, Fray International Sustainability Award, was created in his honor. Fray was also a recipient of the Fray International Sustainability Award in 2011. He was elected a Fellow of the Royal Academy of Engineering (FREng) and a Fellow of the Royal Society (FRS) in 2008.
