= Alice Bunn =

British scientist and administrator

Alice Bunn OBE
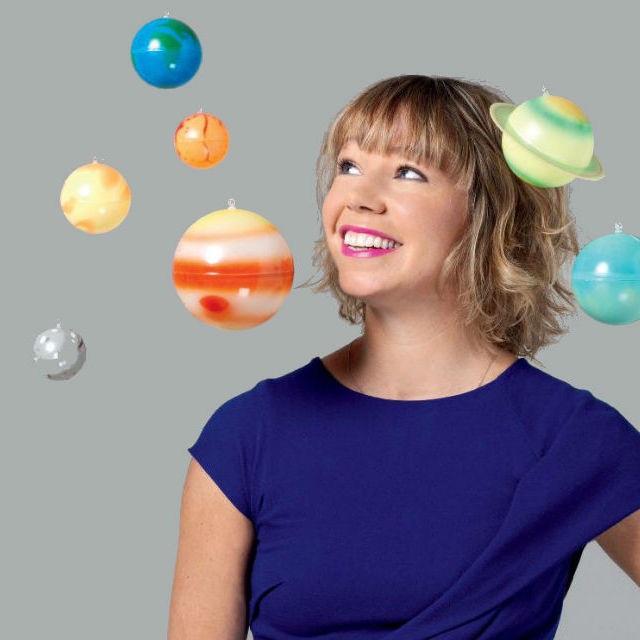
- Alice Bunn in 2015
- Born: Alice M. Bunn
- Education: Shrewsbury High School; Shrewsbury Sixth Form College; University of Leeds; University of Cambridge (PhD)
- Scientific career
- Workplaces: UK Space Agency
- Thesis: Grain refinement in aluminium alloys (1998)
- Doctoral advisor: Lindsay Greer
- Website: imeche.org/about-us/our-people/dr-alice-bunn

Alice Bunn OBE (FIMechE FRAeS CEng) is the former chief executive of the Institution of Mechanical Engineers (IMechE) and previously the international director of the UK Space Agency.

== Early life and education ==
Bunn is from Beckenham. She attended Shrewsbury High School, Shropshire. She completed GCE Advanced Levels at Shrewsbury Sixth Form College in Maths, Physics and Chemistry and studied metallurgy at the University of Leeds, graduating in 1995. She spent a year in Tampere at the University of Finland. She obtained her PhD in 1998 from the University of Cambridge, where she worked in Metallurgy under the supervision of Lindsay Greer.

== Career ==
After completing her PhD, Bunn joined the Science Museum, London as a researcher and developer of exhibitions. She joined the Natural Environment Research Council (NERC) as coordinator of Earth Observation Science in 2000. She was made head of Earth Observation Future Missions in 2002. She joined Department for Environment, Food and Rural Affairs as location programme manager.

Bunn joined the UK Space Agency in 2011. She led the International Charter for Space and Major Disasters from 2011 to 2012. The charter forces the international community to provide satellite imagery immediately after a disaster. She brokered the international agreement that ensured countries share satellite imagery after the MH370 disappearance. She explored how satellite imagery can be used to save lives. She formed a collaboration with the Italian Space Agency to share COSMO-SkyMed data. In 2014 Bunn was appointed director of policy of the UK Space Agency. She led the security, regulation, communications and international engagement. In 2014 she was included in Marie Claire as one of their Top Women. She was elected to the Space Foundation board of directors in 2015. She led the space aspects of the Global Monitoring for Environment and Security programme. She was appointed vice chair of the European Space Agency in 2017. She signed a joint statement to increase cooperation with CNES in January 2018. The collaboration will continue in spite of Brexit. She oversaw the collaborative agreement between Surrey Satellite Technology, Goonhilly Satellite Earth Station and the European Space Agency for commercial lunar missions.

=== Lectures ===
Bunn has spoken at the World Economic Forum and also delivered the Reinventing Space Conference keynote lecture in 2014. She spoke at the National Space Symposium in 2018. She spoke at the 2017 Global Space Congress and TEDx London in 2018.

=== Work in education ===
Bunn has been part of programmes that encourage students to engage with space missions. She also collaborated with the WISE Campaign to create a set of classroom resources based on the space sector to encourage primary school children to study physics. Bunn has advised on civil space activities to the Minister for Universities, Science and Cities.

== Honours and awards ==
In 1998 she won The Minerals, Metals & Materials Society Light Metals Division Light Metals Award for her paper Modelling of the Effectiveness of Al-Ti-B Refiners in Commercial Purity Aluminium. She received The Minerals, Metals & Materials Society Smithells Memorial Prize.

Bunn was appointed Officer of the Order of the British Empire (OBE) in the 2022 Birthday Honours for services to the UK space sector and charity.

In 2025 Bunn was an awardee for the Suffrage Science in Engineering and Physical Sciences.
