= George Chen =

Chinese-born British materials scientist

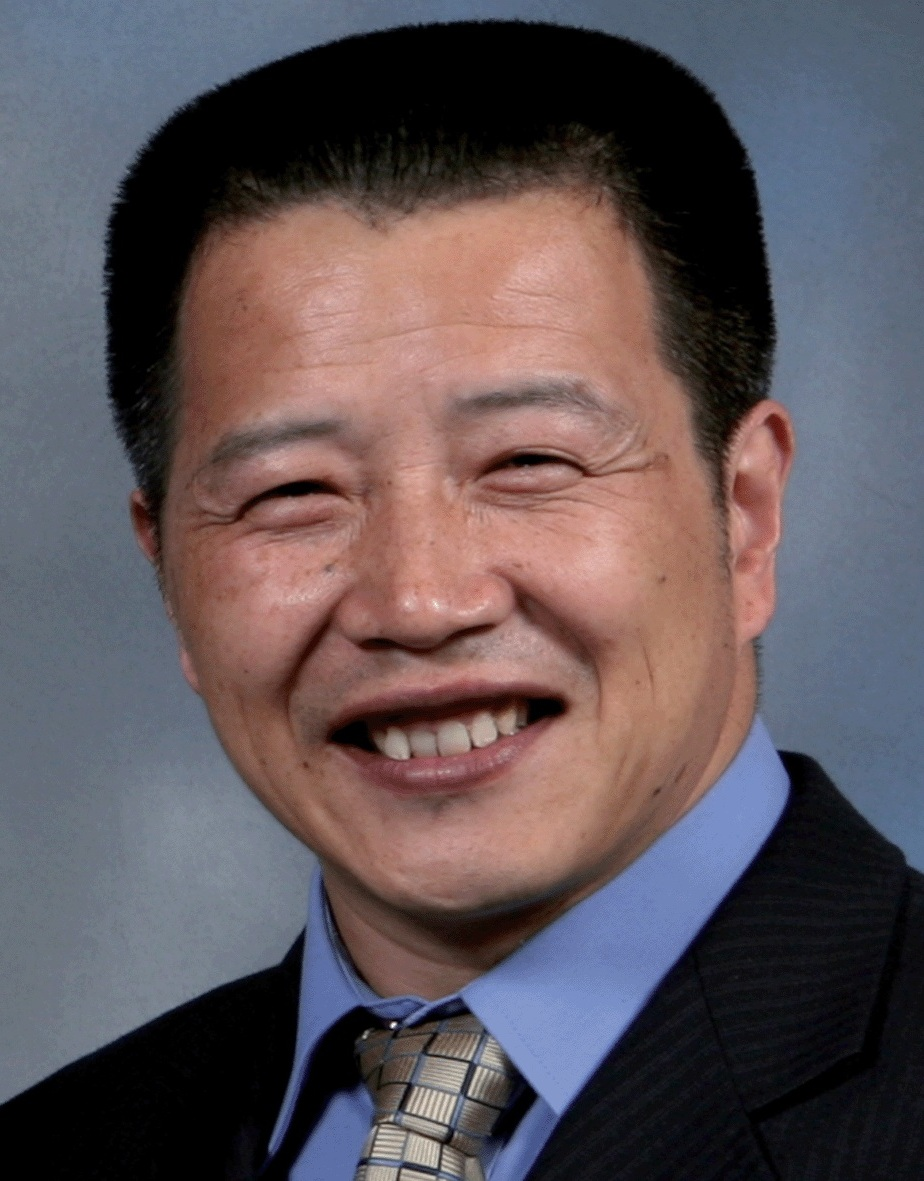
- Born: Chen Zheng; Jiangxi, China
- Education: Fujian Normal University, University of London, Imperial College London
- Known for: FFC Cambridge process
- Scientific career
- Fields: Materials science

George Z. Chen FRSC (Chinese: 陈政; pinyin: Chen Zheng) is a professor of electrochemical technologies at the University of Nottingham. In 1996–1997, together with Derek Fray and Tom Farthing, he co-invented the FFC Cambridge process of electrochemical reduction of oxides to metals, where FFC abbreviates the last names of the inventors.

Chen graduated from Jiujiang Teacher Training College in 1981 and obtained his MSc degree in physical chemistry from Fujian Normal University in 1984. He then moved to England and in 1992 defended his PhD at Imperial College, University of London under the supervision of John Albery. After spending four years as a postdoctoral researcher at the University of Oxford, Leeds University and the University of Cambridge he became Senior Research Associate (1998), Assistant Director of Research (2001) and Official Fellow (2003) of Darwin College, Cambridge. In 2003 he assumed the position of reader at the University of Nottingham and in 2009 was promoted to professor.
