= Alan Windle =

British material scientist (born 1942)

Alan Hardwick Windle (born 20 June 1942) FRS is a British material scientist, and Chair of Materials Science at Cambridge University.

He earned a BSc from Imperial College London, and a PhD from University of Cambridge. He was a lecturer in materials science from 1975 to 1992, and Fellow of Trinity College, Cambridge. In 1997 he was elected a Fellow of the Royal Society.

== Works ==
- A First Course in Crystallography 1978
- Liquid Crystalline Polymers with Prof A M Donald, 1992; with Dr S Hanna and Prof A M Donald, 2006
