= Jason WA Robinson =

Jason Robinson
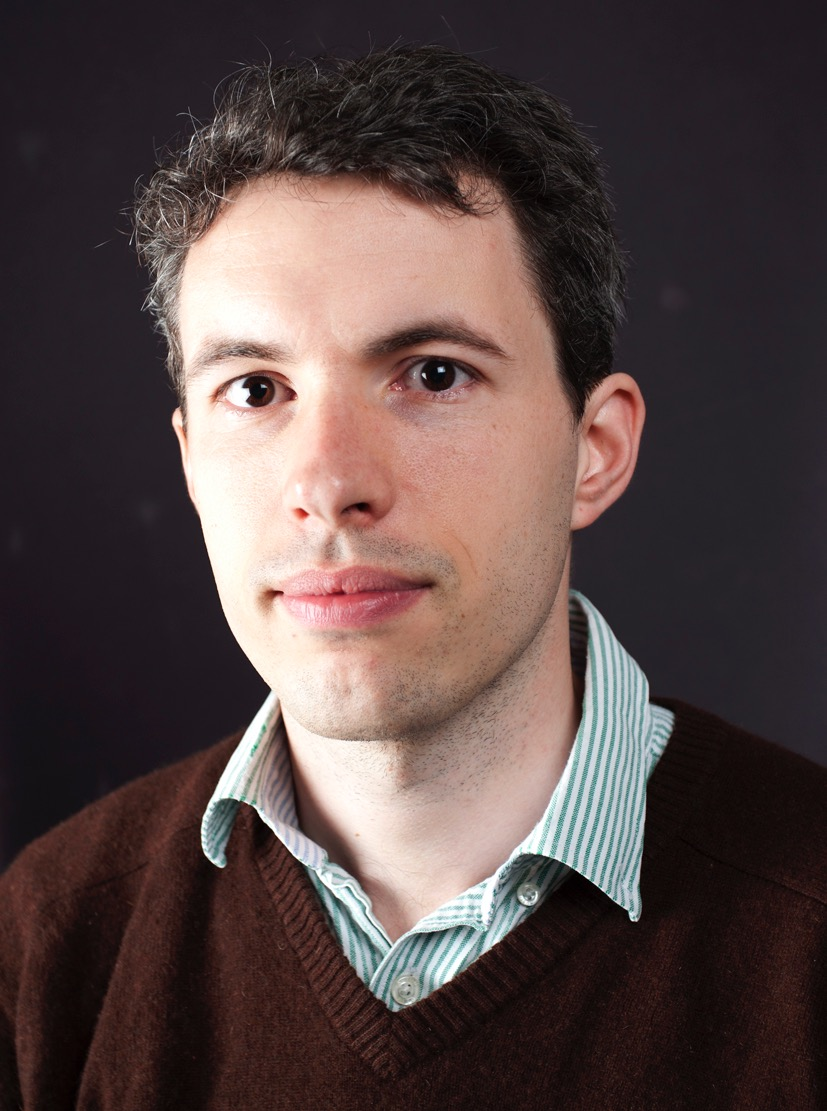
- Born: October 1980 (age 45)
- Education: St John's College, Cambridge
- Scientific career
- Fields: Spintronics; Superconductivity; Magnetism
- Workplaces: University of Cambridge; St John's College, Cambridge
- Thesis: Zero to π oscillations in superconductor-ferromagnet junctions (2007)
- Doctoral advisor: Mark Blamire
- Website: www.robinson.msm.cam.ac.uk

Jason Joseph William Alexander Robinson FIMMM is a British academic, and Professor of Materials Physics at the University of Cambridge in the Department of Materials Science & Metallurgy. He is also a Fellow of St John's College, Cambridge and Distinguished Visiting Professor at City University of Hong Kong. He has worked extensively in the areas of superconductivity, superconducting spintronics, spintronics, magnetism, quantum materials, and nanoelectronics. Particular research topics include the superconductor proximity effect, unconventional superconductivity, quantum and topological transport. He is currently Head of the Department of Materials Science & Metallurgy.

== Research and career ==
Robinson received his PhD from the University of Cambridge in 2007 for research into strongly ferromagnetic Josephson junctions under Prof. Mark Blamire. From 2008 to 2011 he was a Junior Research Fellow in St John's College, Cambridge, and between 2011 and 2018 a University Research Fellow of the Royal Society. In 2015 he was appointed a lecturer in the University Cambridge, a Reader in 2016, and Full Professor in 2019. Robinson is the Editor-in-Chief for the Journal of Superconductivity and Novel Magnetism, (Springer Nature) and the Executive Editor-in-Chief for Cambridge Materials (Cambridge University Press).

== Honours and awards ==
- Fellow of the Institute of Materials, Minerals and Mining (2019 election).
- University Research Fellow, Royal Society (2011 election).
- The Brian Pippard Prize for Superconductivity 2010, Institute of Physics.

== Selected publications ==
- Gutfreund, Alon; Matsuki, Hisakazu; Plastovets, Vadim; Noah, Avia; Gorzawski, Laura; Fridman, Nofar; Guang, Yang; Buzdin, Alexander; Millo, Oded; Robinson, Jason W. A.; Anahory, Yonathan (24 March 2023). "Direct observation of a superconducting vortex diode". Nat Commun. 14 (1): 1630. doi:10.1038/s41467-023-37294-2. PMC 10036628. PMID 36959184.
- Di Bernardo, A.; Millo, O.; Barbone, M.; Alpern, H.; Kalcheim, Y.; et al. (19 January 2017). "p-wave triggered superconductivity in single-layer graphene on an electron-doped oxide superconductor". Nature Communications. 8 (1) 14024. arXiv:1702.01572. Bibcode:2017NatCo...814024D. doi:10.1038/ncomms14024. ISSN 2041-1723. PMC 5253682. PMID 28102222.
- Di Bernardo, A.; Diesch, S.; Gu, Y.; Linder, J.; Divitini, G.; et al. (2 September 2015). "Signature of magnetic-dependent gapless odd frequency states at superconductor/ferromagnet interfaces". Nature Communications. 6 (1): 8053. arXiv:1609.02905. Bibcode:2015NatCo...6.8053D. doi:10.1038/ncomms9053. ISSN 2041-1723. PMC 4569701. PMID 26329811.
- Linder, Jacob; Robinson, Jason W. A. (2015). "Superconducting spintronics". Nature Physics. 11 (4): 307–315. arXiv:1510.00713. Bibcode:2015NatPh..11..307L. doi:10.1038/nphys3242. hdl:11250/2465147. ISSN 1745-2473. S2CID 31028550.
- Banerjee, N.; Smiet, C. B.; Smits, R. G. J.; Ozaeta, A.; Bergeret, F. S.; Blamire, M. G.; Robinson, J. W. A. (9 January 2014). "Evidence for spin selectivity of triplet pairs in superconducting spin valves". Nature Communications. 5 (1). Springer Science and Business Media LLC: 3048. Bibcode:2014NatCo...5.3048B. doi:10.1038/ncomms4048. hdl:10261/102724. ISSN 2041-1723. PMID 24401841.
- Robinson, J. W. A.; Witt, J. D. S.; Blamire, M. G. (10 June 2010). "Controlled Injection of Spin-Triplet Supercurrents into a Strong Ferromagnet". Science. 329 (5987). American Association for the Advancement of Science (AAAS): 59–61. Bibcode:2010Sci...329...59R. doi:10.1126/science.1189246. ISSN 0036-8075. PMID 20538913. S2CID 41752587.
