= FFC Cambridge process =

Metal and metalloid synthesis process by electrolysis

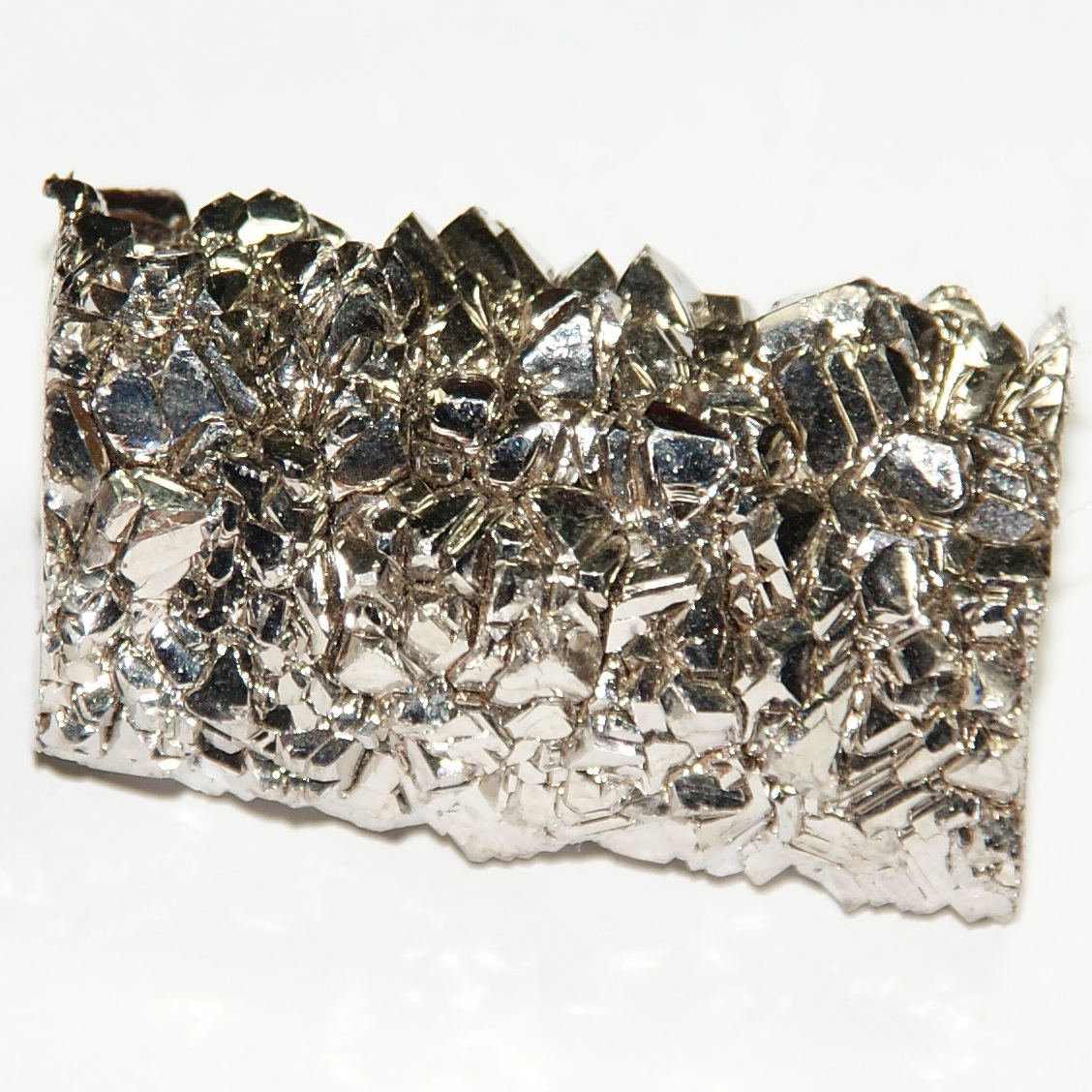

The FFC Cambridge process is an electrochemical method for producing Titanium (Ti) from titanium oxide by electrolysis in molten calcium salts.

== History ==
A process for electrochemical production of titanium through the reduction of titanium oxide in a calcium chloride solution was first described in a 1904 German patent, and in 1954 U.S. patent 2845386A was awarded to Carl Marcus Olson for the production of metals like titanium by reduction of the metal oxide by a molten salt reducing agent in a specific gravity apparatus.

The FFC Cambridge process was developed by George Chen, Derek Fray, and Thomas Farthing between 1996 and 1997 at the University of Cambridge. (The name FFC derives from the first letters of the last names of the inventors). The intellectual property relating to the technology has been acquired by Metalysis, (Sheffield, UK).

== Process ==
The process typically takes place between 900 and 1100 °C, with an anode (typically carbon) and a cathode (the oxide being reduced) in a solution of molten CaCl_{2}. Depending on the nature of the oxide it will exist at a particular potential relative to the anode, which is dependent on the quantity of CaO present in CaCl_{2}.

=== Cathode reaction mechanism ===
The electrocalciothermic reduction mechanism may be represented by the following sequence of reactions, where "M" represents a metal to be reduced (typically titanium).

(1) MO_{x}+ x Ca → M + x CaO

When this reaction takes place on its own, it is referred to as the "calciothermic reduction" (or, more generally, an example of metallothermic reduction). For example, if the cathode was primarily made from TiO then calciothermic reduction would appear as:

TiO + Ca → Ti + CaO

Whilst the cathode reaction can be written as above it is in fact a gradual removal of oxygen from the oxide. For example, it has been shown that TiO_{2} does not simply reduce to Ti. It, in fact, reduces through the lower oxides (Ti_{3}O_{5}, Ti_{2}O_{3}, TiO etc.) to Ti.

The calcium oxide produced is then electrolyzed:

(2a) x CaO → x Ca^{2+} + x O^{2−}

(2b) x Ca^{2+} + 2x e^{−} → x Ca

and

(2c) x O^{2−} → x/2 O_{2} + 2x e^{−}

Reaction (2b) describes the production of Ca metal from Ca^{2+} ions within the salt, at the cathode. The Ca would then proceed to reduce the cathode.

The net result of reactions (1) and (2) is simply the reduction of the oxide into metal plus oxygen:

(3) MO_{x}→ M + x/2 O_{2}

=== Anode reaction mechanism ===
The use of molten CaCl_{2} is important because this molten salt can dissolve and transport the "O^{2−}" ions to the anode to be discharged. The anode reaction depends on the material of the anode. Depending on the system it is possible to produce either CO or CO_{2} or a mixture at the carbon anode:

C + 2O^{2−} → CO_{2} +4 e^{−}
C + O^{2−} → CO + 2 e^{−}

However, if an inert anode is used, such as that of high density SnO_{2}, the discharge of the O^{2−} ions leads to the evolution of oxygen gas. However the use of an inert anode has disadvantages. Firstly, when the concentration of CaO is low, Cl_{2} evolution at the anode becomes more favourable. In addition, when compared to a carbon anode, more energy is required to achieve the same reduced phase at the cathode. Inert anodes suffer from stability issues.

2O^{2−} → O_{2} + 4 e^{−}
