= DoITPoMS =

Free online website for the teaching and learning of Materials Science

- Available in: English
- Founded: 2000 (age 25–26)
- Country of origin: United Kingdom
- Owner: Department of Materials Science and Metallurgy at the University of Cambridge
- Products: Instructional materials for Materials Science
- Website: www.doitpoms.ac.uk
- Commercial: No
- Current status: Active
- Content license: CC BY-NC-SA 4.0 International

Dissemination of IT for the Promotion of Materials Science (DoITPoMS) is a web-based educational software resource designed to facilitate the teaching and learning of Materials science, at the tertiary level for free.

== History ==
The DoITPoMS project originated in the early 1990s, incorporating customized online sources into the curriculum of the Materials Science courses in the Natural Sciences Tripos of the University Cambridge. The initiative became formalized in 2000, with the start of a project supported by the UK national Fund for the Development of Teaching and Learning (FDTL). This was led by the Department of Materials Science and Metallurgy at the University of Cambridge with five partner institutions, including the University of Leeds, London Metropolitan University, the University of Manchester, Oxford Brookes University, and the University of Sheffield. This period of cooperation lasted for about 10 years.

The FDTL project was aimed at building on expertise concerning the use of Information Technology (IT) to enhance the student learning experience and to disseminate these techniques within the Materials Education community in the UK and globally. This was done by creating an archive of background information, such as video clips, micrographs, simulations, etc, and libraries of teaching and learning packages (TLPs) that covers a particular topic, which were designed both for independent usage by students and as a teaching aid for educators. A vital feature of these packages is a high level of user interactivity.

DoITPoMS has no commercial sponsors and no advertising is permitted on the site. The background science to the resources within DoITPoMS has all been input by unpaid volunteers, most of whom have been academics based in universities. A single person retains responsibility for a particular resource, and these people are credited to the site. While the logo of University of Cambridge does appear on the site, is content is available freely and licensed under CC BY-NC-SA 2.0 UK.

== Format and usage ==
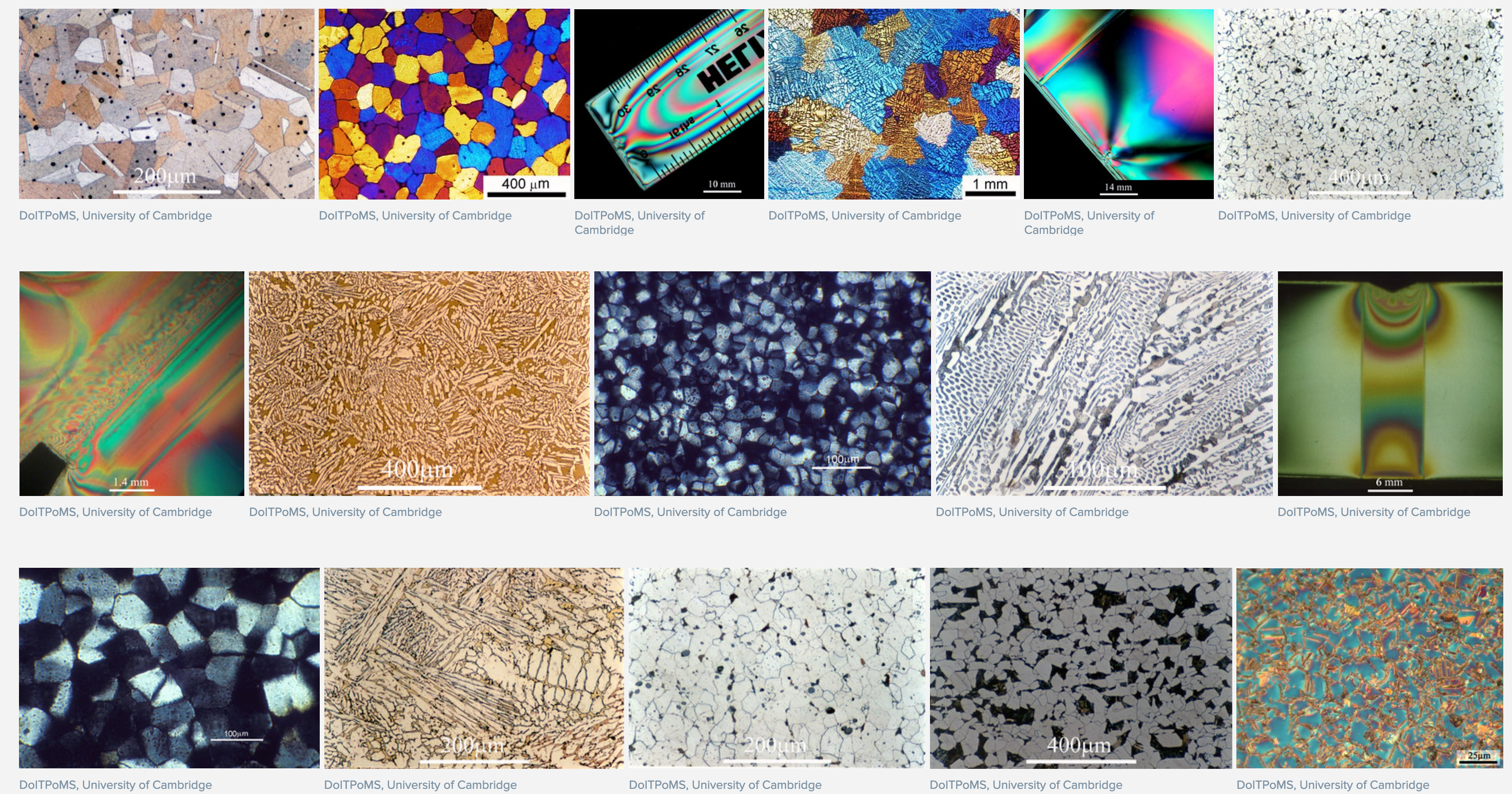
A small subset of the 900 images in the micrograph library

The set of resources currently available on the site comprises Libraries of TLPs (~75), Micrographs (~900), Video clips (~150), Lecture demonstration packages (5), and Stand-alone simulations (2). These all have slightly different purposes, and the modes of usage cover a wide range. In each TLP, several simulations typically allow the user to input data to visualise the characteristics of particular effects or phenomena. This is to enable students to explore areas in their way and facilitates the creation of exercises by educators. Each TLP has a set of questions at the end, designed to test whether the main points of the TLP have been understood.

The TLPs cover many diverse topics within the broad field of Materials science, ranging from basics, such as crystal structures and thermal conduction, to more applied areas, such as the design and functioning of batteries and fuel cells. Tools such as X-ray diffraction and the finite element method are also included. Many, although not all, of these topics, go into greater depth and are designed explicitly as educational resources.

Approximately half a million users accessed the site in 2021.
