= Neil D. Mathur =

Neil Mathur
- Born: Neil David Mathur
- Education: University of Cambridge
- Scientific career
- Fields: Material physics
- Workplaces: University of Cambridge
- Thesis: Quantum order in heavy fermion systems (1995)
- Website: www.msm.cam.ac.uk/department/profiles/mathur.php

Neil David Mathur is a Professor in Materials Physics in the Department of Materials Science and Metallurgy at the University of Cambridge.

== Education ==
Mathur received his PhD from the University of Cambridge in 1995 for research into heavy fermion systems.

== Research ==
Mathur's area of research is magnetic and electronic oxides, with a concentration on crystalline oxides. He has been experimenting with thin films (epitaxial films) and exploring applications for use in interfacing and imaging. He is the co-author of Mesoscopic texture in manganites with Peter Littlewood and Nanotechnology: The Third Way.
