= National High Magnetic Field Laboratory =

Magnetism research institute in the United States

Coordinates: 30.425215°N 84.320915°W

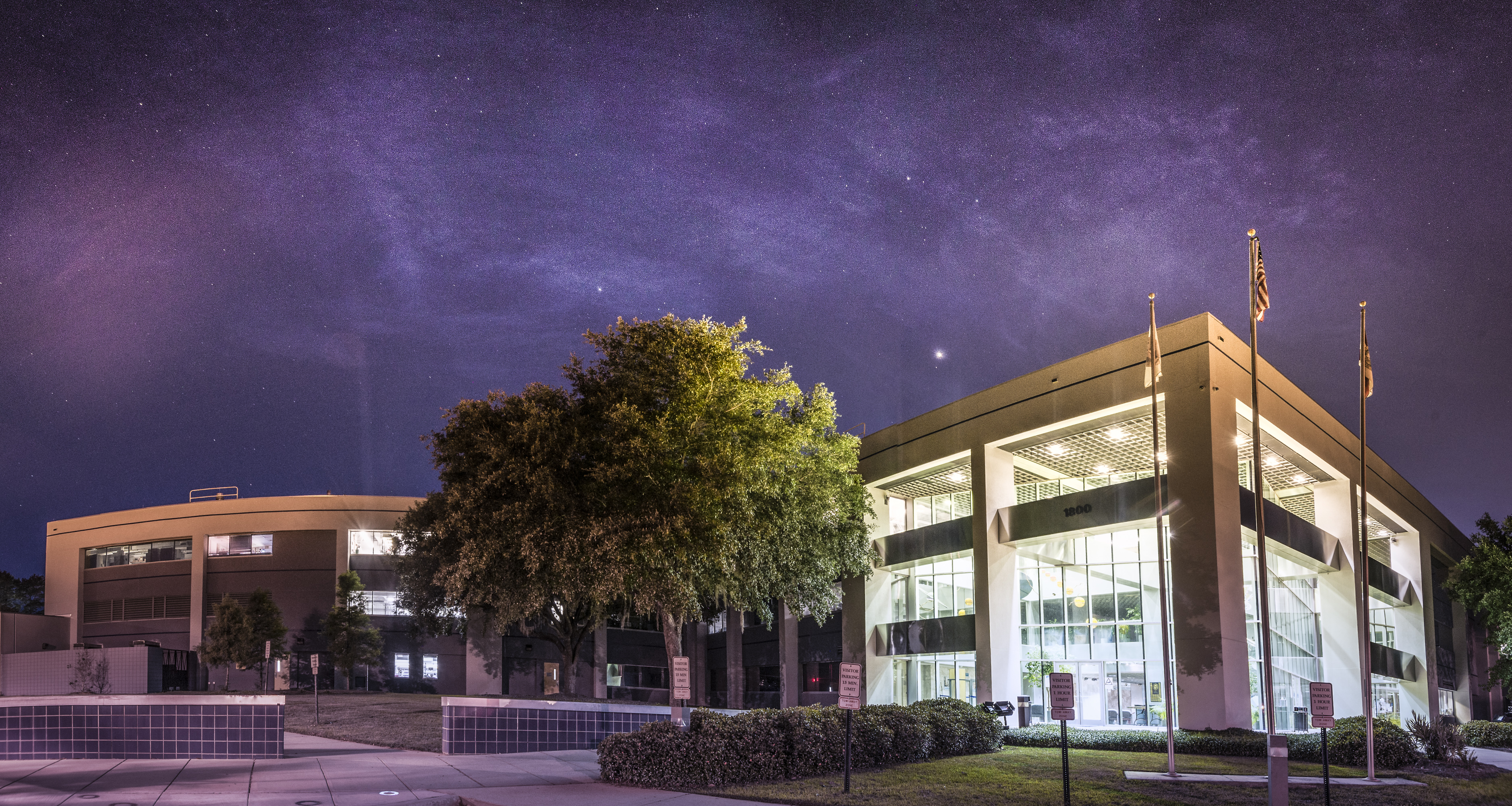
- National MagLab At Night
- Nickname: National MagLab
- Established: October 1, 1994
- Budget: $48.4 million
- Director: Kathleen M. Amm
- Location: 1800 E. Paul Dirac Drive Tallahassee, Florida 32310, Tallahassee, Florida
- Campus: Florida State University
- Affiliations: Florida State University, University of Florida, Los Alamos National Laboratory
- Operating agency: Florida State University
- Website: nationalmaglab.org

The National High Magnetic Field Laboratory (MagLab) is a facility at Florida State University, the University of Florida, and Los Alamos National Laboratory in New Mexico, that performs magnetic field research in physics, biology, bioengineering, chemistry, geochemistry, and biochemistry. It is the only such facility in the US, and is among twelve high magnetic facilities worldwide. The lab is supported by the National Science Foundation and the state of Florida, and works in collaboration with private industry. The facility also includes the DC Magnet building and the Nuclear Magnetic Resonance building.

The lab holds several world records for the world's strongest magnets, including highest magnetic field of 45.5 tesla. For nuclear magnetic resonance spectroscopy experiments, its 33-short-ton (29-long-ton; 30 t) series connected hybrid (SCH) magnet broke the record during a series of tests conducted by MagLab engineers and scientists on 15 November 2016, reaching its full field of 36 tesla.

== History ==
=== Proposal and award ===
In 1989, Florida State University (FSU), Los Alamos National Laboratory, and the University of Florida submitted a proposal to the National Science Foundation (NSF) for a new national laboratory supporting interdisciplinary research in high magnetic fields. The plan proposed a federal-state partnership serving magnet-related research, science and technology education, and partnering industry. The goal was to maintain the competitive position of the US in magnet-related research and development. Following a peer-review competition, the NSF approved the FSU-led consortium's proposal.

=== Competing proposal by MIT ===
In a competing proposal to the NSF, the Massachusetts Institute of Technology (MIT), with the University of Iowa, the University of Wisconsin–Madison, Brookhaven National Laboratory, and Argonne National Laboratory, had suggested improving the existing world-class Francis Bitter Magnet Laboratory at MIT. On September 5, 1990, MIT researchers asked the 21 members of the National Science Board (NSB) to "review and reconsider" its decision. With $60 million at stake in the NSF grant, MIT stated it would phase out the Francis Bitter Lab if it lost its appeal, the first of its kind in NSF history. The request was turned down September 18, 1990.

=== Early years ===
The laboratory's early years were spent establishing infrastructure, building the facility, and recruiting faculty. The Tallahassee complex was dedicated on October 1, 1994, to a large crowd, with keynote speaker Vice President Al Gore.

=== Folk legend ===
A scientifically unsupported folk legend and popular joke among Tallahassee residents is that the magnetic lab shields Tallahassee from hurricanes and from inclement weather in general.

== Mission ==
The lab's mission, as set forth by the NSF, is: "To provide the highest magnetic fields and necessary services for scientific research conducted by users from a wide range of disciplines, including physics, chemistry, materials science, engineering, biology and geology."

The lab focuses on four objectives:

- Develop user facilities and services for magnet-related research, open to all qualified scientists and engineers
- Advance magnet technology in cooperation with industry
- Promote a multidisciplinary research environment and administer in-house research program that uses and advances the facilities
- Develop an educational outreach program

=== Education and public outreach ===
The National MagLab promotes science education and supports science, engineering, and science teachers through its Center for Integrating Research and Learning. Programs include mentorships in an interdisciplinary learning environment. Through the Magnet Academy, the lab's website provides educational content on electricity and magnetism.

The National MagLab also conducts monthly tours open to the public, and hosts an annual open house with about 10,000 attendees. Special tour and outreach opportunities are also available to local schools. In an interview on Skepticality, Dr. Scott Hannahs said, "If you come by on the third Saturday in February I believe we have an open house and we have tesla coils shooting sparks and we melt rocks in the geochemistry group and we measure the speed of sound and we have lasers and potato launchers and we just have all sorts of things showing little scientific principles and stuff. We get together and we have about 5,000 people show up to come and tour a physics lab which is a pretty amazing group of people."

== Programs ==
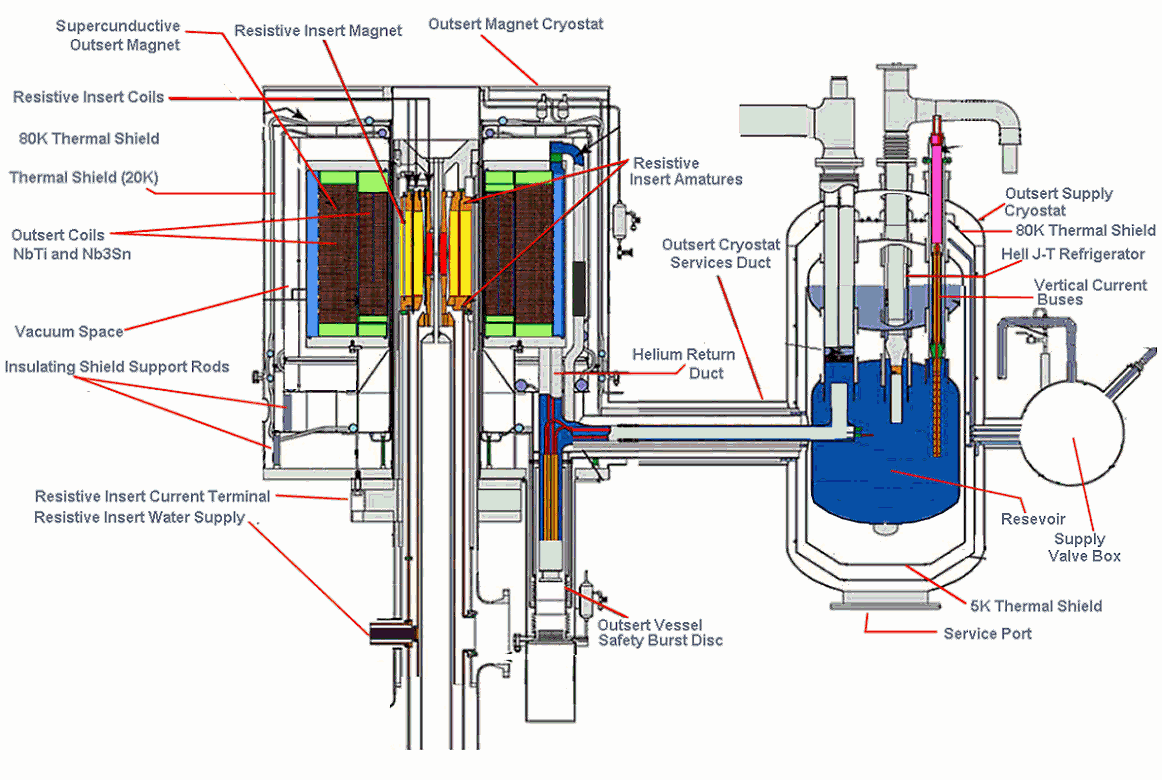
Diagram of the 45 tesla hybrid magnet

=== Florida State University programs ===
The Tallahassee laboratory at Florida State University is a 370,000 sq ft (34,000 m^{2}) complex and has approximately 300 faculty, staff, graduate, and postdoctoral students. Its director is physicist Kathleen Amm. Its chief scientist is Laura Greene.

==== DC field program ====
The facility contains 14 resistive magnet cells connected to a 48 megawatt DC power supply and 15,000 square feet (1,400 m^{2}) of cooling equipment to remove the heat generated by the magnets. The facility houses several magnets, including a 45 tesla hybrid magnet, which combines resistive and superconducting magnets. The lab's 41.4 tesla resistive magnet is the strongest DC (continuous-field) resistive magnet in the world, and the 25 Tesla Keck magnet has the highest homogeneity of any resistive magnet.

==== NMR spectroscopy and imaging ====
This program serves a broad user base in solution and solid state NMR spectroscopy and MRI and diffusion measurements at high magnetic field strengths. The lab develops technology, methodology, and applications at high magnetic fields through both in-house and external user activities. An in-house made 900 MHz (21.1 tesla) NMR magnet has an ultra-wide bore measuring 105 mm (about 4 inches) in diameter, this superconducting magnet has the highest field for MRI study of a living animals.

==== Ion cyclotron resonance ====
The Fourier transform ion cyclotron resonance mass spectrometry program is involved in instrument and technique development and applications of FT-ICR mass spectrometry. Under the leadership of director Alan G. Marshall, the program continuously develops techniques and instruments and applications of FT-ICR mass spectrometry. The program has several instruments, including a 14.5 tesla, 104 mm bore system.

==== Electron magnetic resonance ====
The most common form of EMR is electron paramagnetic/spin resonance (EPR/ESR). In EPR experiments, transitions are observed between the m_{s} sublevels of an electronic spin state S that are split by the applied magnetic field as well as by the fine structure interactions and the electron-nuclear hyperfine interactions. This technique has applications in chemistry, biochemistry, biology, physics and materials research.

==== Magnet science and technology ====
The Magnet Science and Technology division is charged with developing the technology and expertise for magnet systems. These magnet projects include building advanced magnet systems for the Tallahassee and Los Alamos sites, working with industry to develop the technology to improve high-field magnet manufacturing capabilities, and improving high field magnet systems through research and development.

Also at the lab's FSU headquarters, the Applied Superconductivity Center advances the science and technology of superconductivity for both the low temperature niobium-based and the high temperature cuprate or MgB_{2}-based materials. The ASC pursues the superconductors for magnets for fusion, high energy physics, MRI, and electric power transmission lines and transformers.

==== In-house research ====
The in-house research program utilizes MagLab facilities to pursue high field research in science and engineering, while advancing the lab's user programs through development of new techniques and equipment.

==== Condensed matter group ====
The condensed matter group scientists concentrate on various aspects of condensed matter physics, including studies and experiments involving magnetism, the quantum hall effect, quantum oscillations, high temperature superconductivity, and heavy fermion systems.

==== Geochemistry program ====
The geochemistry research program is centered around the use of trace elements and isotopes to understand the Earth processes and environment. The research interests range from the chemical evolution of Earth and Solar System through time to local scale problems on the sources and transport of environmentally significant substances. The studies conducted by the geochemistry division concern terrestrial and extraterrestrial questions and involve land-based and seagoing expeditions and spacecraft missions. Together with FSU's Chemistry and Oceanography departments, Geochemistry has started a program in Biogeochemical Dynamics.

==== Other programs ====
Other programs include cryogenics, optical microscopy, quantum materials and resonant ultrasound spectroscopy.

The lab also has a materials research team that researches new ways to make high strength magnetic materials using more common and cheaper elements.

=== Los Alamos National Laboratory Pulsed Field Facility ===
Los Alamos National Laboratory in New Mexico hosts the Pulsed Field Facility, which provides researchers with experimental capabilities for a wide range of measurements in non-destructive pulsed fields to 101 tesla (75 T first and 101 T under repair). Pulsed field magnets create high magnetic fields, but only for fractions of a second. The laboratory is located at the center of Los Alamos. In 1999–2000, the facility was relocated into a new specially designed Experimental Hall to better accommodate user operations and support. The program is the first and only high pulsed field user facility in the United States.

The facility provides a wide variety of experimental capabilities to 100 tesla, using short and long pulse magnets. Power comes from a pulsed power infrastructure which includes a 1.43 gigawatt motor generator and five 64-megawatt power supplies. The 1200-ton motor generator sits on a 4800-short ton (4350 t) inertia block which rests on 60 springs to minimize earth tremors and is the centerpiece of the Pulsed Field Laboratory.

The facility's magnets include a 60 tesla long-pulse magnet (under repair) that is the most powerful controlled-pulse magnet in the world.

=== University of Florida ===
The University of Florida is home to user facilities in magnetic resonance imaging or (MRI) with an ultra-low temperature, ultra-quiet environment for experimental studies in the High B/T (high magnetic field/low temperature) Facility. Facilities are also available for the fabrication and characterization of nanostructures at a new nanoscale research facility operated in conjunction with the university's Major Analytical and Instrumentation Center.

==== High B/T Facility ====
The High B/T Facility is part of the Microkelvin Laboratory of the Physics Department and conducts experiments in high magnetic fields up to 15.2 tesla and at temperatures as low as 0.4 mK simultaneously for studies of magnetization, thermodynamic quantities, transport measurements, magnetic resonance, viscosity, diffusion, and pressure.

The facility holds world records for high B/T in Bay 1 for short term low field capabilities and world records for high field long time (> 1 week) experiments. The research group leads the world in collective studies of quantum fluids and solids in terms of breadth and low temperature techniques (thermometry, NMR, ultrasound, heat capacity, sample cooling.)

==== Advanced Magnetic Resonance Imaging and Spectroscopy ====
The Advanced Magnetic Resonance Imaging and Spectroscopy program contains facilities for the Mag Lab's NMR and MRIProgram that complement the facilities at the lab's headquarters in Tallahassee. The program is located at the University of Florida's McKnight Brain Institute. Their instruments include a 600 MHz NMR magnet with 1.5 mm triple-resonance, high-temperature superconducting probe, which delivers the highest 13C-optimized mass sensitivity of any probe in the world.
