= List of women fellows of the Royal Academy of Engineering =

The page lists women fellows of the Royal Academy of Engineering (FREng), elected by the Royal Academy of Engineering in the UK.

The Royal Academy of Engineering (RAEng), founded in 1976, is the youngest of the five national academies in the UK. It represents the nation's best practising engineers, innovators, and entrepreneurs, who are very often in leading roles in industry, business, and academia. Fellowship of the RAEng is a national honour, bringing prestige to both the individual and any organisation the Fellow is associated with. In recent years between 50 and 60 new fellows have been chosen each year by peer review from nominations made by the current fellowship;. Those proposed for fellowship must come "from among eminent engineers regarded by virtue of their personal achievements in the field of engineering as being of exceptional merit and distinction".

All 130 of the founding fellows in 1976 were men. Four women were elected in the first 20 years, the first in 1982. In all, 13 women fellows pre-date 2000, with a further 20 elected before 2010 and 65 in the decade before 2020. In 2010 the Council determined a policy that over time 10–20% of newly elected fellows should be women.

The Academy published a diversity and inclusion action plan for the five years from 2020 but does not regularly publish the proportion of women engineers in the current fellowship, estimated in 2019 to be less than 7%. In July 2020 it launched a campaign aimed at delivering a 'Fellowship that is Fit for the Future' by the time it celebrates its 50th anniversary in 2026 and set an aspiration that at least half of all candidates elected each year will be from under-represented target groups. In 2023 six of the 60 new fellows, in 2024 twenty one of the 60, in 2025 fourteen of the 60and in 2026 seventeen of the 60 were women.

As of 2026, 189 women have been elected to Fellowship, plus twenty one international fellows, seventeen honorary fellows, and one royal fellow.

== Fellows ==
List of female fellows
Year of election	Image	Fellow	Field(s) of work; academia/industry	RAEng appointments/awards and notes	Refs.
1982		Elizabeth Killick	Electronic engineering, marine technology; industry	Died 2019	
1987		Beryl Platt	Aeronautical engineering; industry	Died 2015	
1992		Agnes Kaposi	Electrical engineering; academia and industry		
1995		Patricia Foster	Electrical engineering; industry		
1996		Ann Dowling	Mechanical engineering, aeroacoustics; academia	First woman President of the RAEng, 2014–2019	
1996		Sue Ion	Nuclear engineering; industry	A vice-president of RAEng, 2002–2008; first woman to be awarded RAEng President's medal 2014	
1996		Rachel Spooncer	Chemical engineering; industry	First woman to win MacRobert Award, (with ICI, 1993)	
1997		Joanna Kennedy	Civil engineering; industry		
1997		Julia King	Fracture mechanics; academia	Led RAEng working party on 'Educating Engineers for the 21st Century' 2007	
1997		Susan Lyons	Manufacturing engineering; industry and academia		
1999		Yvonne Barton	Geotechnical engineering; industry and academia		
1999		Julia Higgins	Chemical engineering; academia	A vice-president of RAEng, 2008–2011	
1999		Pamela Liversidge	Mechanical engineering; industry		
2000		Wendy Hall	Computer science; academia	First woman to be RAEng Senior Vice-President 2005–2008	
2001		Stephanie Shirley	Information technology; industry and philanthropy		
2002		Polina Bayvel	Optical networking; industry and academia		
2002		Amanda Chessell	Computer science; industry and academia	First woman to be awarded the RAEng Silver Medal 2001	
2002		Helen Stone	Civil engineering; industry		
2003		Lynn Gladden	Chemical engineering; academia		
2003		Faith Wainwright	Structural engineering; industry	Editorial Board member of RAEng magazine Ingenia	
2004		Maria Petrou	Signal processing; academia	Died 2012	
2005		Amanda Petford-Long	Materials science; academia		
2006		Elizabeth Tanner	Biomedical engineering; academia	Editorial Board member of RAEng magazine Ingenia; RAEng Trustee Board 2017-	
2006		Jean Venables	Civil engineering; industry and academia		
2007		Helen Atkinson	Materials engineering; academia	A vice-president of RAEng, 2012–2014; RAEng Trustee Board 2014–2016	
2007		Dervilla Mitchell	Civil engineering; industry	A vice-president of RAEng, 2011–2014	
2008		Jo da Silva	Civil engineering; industry and international development		
2008		Alison Noble	Biomedical engineering; industry and academia		
2008		Sarah Spurgeon	Control engineering; industry and academia		
2009		Sarah Springman	Geotechnical engineering; industry and academia		
2009		Nina Thornhill	Chemical engineering; industry and academia		
2009		Jane Wernick	Structural engineering; industry and academia		
2009		Sophie Wilson	Computer science; industry and academia		
2010		Jane Atkinson	Chemical engineering; industry		
2010		Jayne Bryant	Chemical engineering; industry		
2010		Carol Burke	Manufacturing engineering; industry		
2010		Carole Goble	Computer science; academia		
2010		Judith Hackitt	Chemical engineering; industry		
2010		Anne Neville	Mechanical engineering; academia	Died 2022; RAEng chair in Emerging technologies, University of Leeds	
2011		(Sarah Regina) Ginny Clarke	Civil engineering, highway engineering; industry	Editorial Board member of RAEng magazine Ingenia	
2011		Lianne Deeming	Materials engineering; industry		
2011		Eileen Harkin-Jones	Polymer engineering; academia	Bombardier-RAEng chair in Composites Engineering at Ulster University from 2014	
2011		Michelle McDowell	Civil engineering; industry		
2011		Jeni Mundy	Electronic engineering; industry		
2011		Frances Saunders	Electronic engineering; industry	RAEng Trustee Board 2015-	
2011		Abigail Sellen	Human-computer interaction; industry		
2011		Liane Smith	Materials science, corrosion engineering; industry		
2012		Serena Best	Materials science; academia		
2012		Cynthia Carroll	Mining engineering; industry		
2012		Jane Jiang	Precision engineering; industry and academia	Renishaw-RAEng chair in Precision Metrology at the University of Huddersfield from 2015	
2012		Elaine Martin	Chemical engineering; academia	Formerly Editorial Board member of RAEng magazine Ingenia; RAEng Trustee Board 2014-	
2012		Jane Plant	Geochemistry; academia	Died 2016	
2013		Adisa Azapagic	Chemical engineering, sustainable engineering; academia		
2013		Muffy Calder	Computer science; academia		
2013		Naomi Climer	Media technology; industry	RAEng Trustee Board 2017-	
2013		Janice Crawford	Chemical engineering; industry		
2013		Carolyn Griffiths	Mechanical engineering, railway engineering; industry		
2013		Raffaella Ocone	Chemical engineering; academia		
2013		Molly Stevens	Biomaterials science; academia		
2014		Patricia Connolly	Bioengineering; academia and industry		
2014		Pratibha Gai	Electron microscopy, nanotechnology; academia and industry		
2014		Karen Scrivener	Materials science; academia		
2015		Claire Adjiman	Chemical engineering; academia		
2015		Karen Holford	Mechanical engineering, acoustic emission; academia and industry		
2015		Mary Ryan	Electrochemistry; academia	Shell-RAEng chair in Interfacial Nanoscience for Engineering Systems, Imperial College London from 2015	
2015		Angela Sasse	Computer science, information security; academia		
2016		Jane Butler	Electronic engineering, computer science; academia and industry		
2016		Sarah Hainsworth	Forensic materials engineering; academia		
2016		Barbara Lane	Fire protection engineering; industry and academia		
2016		Catriona Schmolke	Civil engineering; industry		
2017		Joan Cordiner	Chemical engineering, agrochemicals; industry		
2017		Alicia El Haj	Biological engineering, regenerative medicine; academia		
2017		Caroline Hargrove	Mechanical engineering, human–machine interaction; industry and academia		
2017		Rachel Hurst	Manufacturing engineering; industry		
2017		Ursula Martin	Computer science; academia		
2017		Angela Strank	Chemical engineering, petroleum engineering; industry		
2017		Eleanor Stride	Biomedical engineering; academia and industry		
2017		Anne Trefethen	Computer science; academia		
2017		Sarah Williamson	Structural engineering; industry		
2018		Judith Driscoll	Materials science; academia		
2018		Susan Gray	Aviation engineering; Royal Air Force		
2018		Rebecca Lunn	Civil engineering, geotechnical engineering; academia	BAM Nuttall-RAEng chair, University of Strathclyde from 2017	
2018		Hilary Mercer	Mechanical engineering, project management; industry		
2018		Rachel Thomson	Materials engineering; academia		
2018		Rachel Williams	Biomedical engineering; academia		
2019		Shirin Dehghan	Electronic engineering; industry		
2019		Bridget Eickhoff	Railway engineering; industry		
2019		Luisa Freitas dos Santos	Chemical engineering; industry		
2019		Alice Gast	Chemical engineering; academia		
2019		Rebecca Lingwood	Fluid dynamics; academia		
2019		Catherine McClay	Electrical engineering; industry		
2019		Máire O'Neill	Cyber security; academia	RAEng Silver Medal (2014)	
2019		Maja Pantić	Artificial intelligence; academia		
2019		Fiona Rayment	Nuclear power; industry		
2019		Leigh-Ann Russell	Petroleum engineering; industry		
2019		Dimitra Simeonidou	Telecommunications engineering; academia		
2019		Rachel Skinner	Transportation engineering; industry		
2019		Lila Tachtsi	Highway engineering; industry		
2020		Julie Bregulla	Fire engineering, structural engineering; industry		
2020		Dawn Childs	Mechanical engineering, aeronautical engineering; industry		
2020		Philippa Gardner	Computer science; academia		
2020		Deborah Greaves	Marine engineering; academia		
2020		Esther Rodriguez-Villegas	Wearable technology; academia and industry	RAEng Silver medal (2020)	
2020		Lucy Rogers	Mechanical engineering, fluid dynamics; science communication	RAEng Visiting professor at Brunel University	
2020		Tong Sun	Sensor engineering, photonics; academia	RAEng Silver medal (2016); RAEng Research professor (2018)	
2020		Alison Vincent	Cyber security, software engineering; industry		
2021		Jade Alglave	Computer science; academia and industry	RAEng Silver medal (2018)	
2021		Ruth Allen	Civil engineering, infrastructure; industry		
2021		Alison Atkinson	Nuclear engineering, project management; industry		
2021		Alice Delahunty	Electrical engineering; industry		
2021		Penelope Endersby	Physics, artificial intelligence; academia and industry		
2021		Elspeth Finch	Entrepreneur; industry	RAEng Silver medal (2013)	
2021		Jarmila Glassey	Chemical engineering; academia		
2021		Paola Lettieri	Chemical engineering, fluidisation; academia		
2021		Margaret Lucas	Civil engineering, ultrasonics; academia		
2021		Aimee Morgans	Mechanical engineering, thermofluids; academia	RAEng/EPSRC Research Fellow (2004-09)	
2021		Catherine Noakes	Mechanical engineering, environmental engineering; academia		
2021		Rachel Oliver	Materials science; academia		
2021		Tiziana Rossetto	Structural engineering, earthquake engineering; academia		
2021		Julia Sutcliffe	Computer science, aeronautical engineering; academia and industry		
2021		Patricia Thornley	Environmental engineering; academia and industry		
2021		Rebecca Weston	Nuclear engineering; industry		
2022		Dawn Bonfield	Aerospace materials; diversity and inclusion	RAEng Visiting professor of Inclusive engineering	
2022		Suzanne Farid	Bioprocess engineering; academia		
2022		Susan Gourvenec	Offshore geotechnical engineering; industry	RAEng chair in Emerging Technology	
2022		Christine Ourmières-Widener	Aerospace engineering; industry		
2022		Yoge Patel	Artificial intelligence; industry		
2022		Honor Powrie	Artificial intelligence; industry		
2022		Elena Rodriguez-Falcon	Mechanical engineering; academia		
2022		Judith Sykes	Infrastructure; industry		
2022		Niki Trigoni	Software engineering; academia and industry		
2023		Ruth Cameron	Biomaterials; academia and industry		
2023		Rosemary Francis	Computer architecture, software engineering; industry		
2023		Caroline Hazlewood	Hydraulic engineering; industry		
2023		Gwen Parry-Jones	Nuclear physics; industry		
2023		Catriona Savage	Naval architecture; academia and industry		
2023		Barbara Shollock	Materials science; academia		

2024

- Saritha Arunkumar
- Kate Black
- Jacqueline Castle
- Claire Davis
- Vania De Stefani
- Ila Glennie
- Laura Jones
- Sohini Kar-Narayan
- Sue Partridge
- Anna Peacock
- Roisin Quinn
- Catherine Ramsdale
- Pratima Rangarajan
- Anna-Lee Reilly
- Roni Savage
- Sarah Sharples
- Rebecca Shipley
- Phillipa Slater
- Eva Sorensen
- Melissa Terras
- Jennifer Wen

2025

- Panagiota Angeli
- Lydia Balogun-Wilson
- Donna Blackmond
- Isabel Coman
- Rachel Cooke
- Sun Yan Evans
- Sofia Guerra
- Zara Hodgson
- Nicola Johnson
- Cecilia Mascolo
- Eleanor Schofield
- Jennifer Schooling
- Zoe Shipton
- Barbara Welch

2026

- Lourdes Agapito
- Rachael Ambury
- Kirsty Armer
- Chan Boodhai
- Loubna Bouarfa
- Fiona Cousins
- Dina DʼAyala
- Barbara Evans
- Danielle George
- Beverley Gibbs
- Cathy Holt
- Lila Ibrahim
- Mercedes Maroto-Valer
- Alison Norrish
- Jhuma Sadhukhan
- Nina Maria Skorupska
- Lidija Zdravkovic

== International Fellows ==
International Fellows are engineers of international distinction who are not of British nationality and who are not resident and working in Britain. The number of International Fellows cannot exceed one-tenth of the number of Fellows, and no more than ten may be elected in any year.

List of female International Fellows
Year of election	Image	Fellow	Field(s) of work; Academia/Industry	Notes	Refs.
2004		Jane Grimson	Computer science; academia		
2011		Anne Lauvergeon	Chemical engineering; industry		
2012		Shirley Ann Jackson	Particle physics; academia		
2012		Allyson Lawless	Civil engineering; industry		
2013		Ursula Burns	Mechanical engineering; industry		
2018		Frances Arnold	Chemical engineering; academia	Nobel Prize in Chemistry 2018	
2022		Rebecca Enonchong	Entrepreneur; industry		
2022		Andrea Goldsmith	Electrical engineering; academia and industry		
2022		Grazia Vittadini	Aeronautical engineering; industry		
2023		Nadine Aubry	Fluid mechanics; academia		
2023		Marlene Kanga	Chemical engineering; industry		
2023		Viola Vogel	Bioengineering; academia		
2024		Elaine Oran			
2025		Elsie Effah Kaufmann			
2025		Ilya Espino de Marotta			
2025		Linda Godfrey	Engineering		
2025		Muriel Médard			

2026

- Efi Foufoula-Georgiou
- Selda Gunsel
- Sue Harrison
- Dorothy Okello

== Honorary Fellows ==
Persons not being Fellows who have made or are making a distinguished contribution to the practice of engineering are eligible for election as Honorary Fellows. Their number cannot exceed fifty and no more than five may be elected in any year.

List of female Honorary Fellows
Year of election	Image	Honorary Fellow	Refs.
2008		Anne Glover	
2008		Vanessa Lawrence	
2021		Roma Agrawal	
2021		Yewande Akinola	
2021		Anne-Marie Imafidon	
2021		Steph McGovern	
2022		Nike Folayan	
2022		Hannah Fry	
2022		Damilola Ogunbiyi	
2023		Kate Bingham	
2023		Martha Lane Fox	
2023		Angela McLean	

2024

- Rebecca Fitzgerald

2025

- Maggie Aderin-Pocock

2026

- Katherine Bennett
- Sile O'Modhrain
- Hayaatun Sillem

== Royal Fellows ==
Royal Fellows are such members of the Royal Family as on the invitation of the Board shall agree to become Royal Fellows.

List of female Royal Fellows
Year of invitation	Image	Royal Fellow	Refs.
2010		Anne, Princess Royal	
