= Kaposi =

Kaposi is a surname. Notable people with the surname include:

- Agnes Kaposi (born 1932), British-Hungarian engineer and author
- Moritz Kaposi (1837–1902), a Hungarian physician and dermatologist
  - Kaposi's sarcoma, a type of cancer
