= Ruth Cameron (scientist) =

British materials scientist

- Education: University of Cambridge
- Known for: Biomaterials
- Awards: Suffrage Science award (2021)
- Scientific career
- Workplaces: University of Cambridge

Ruth Cameron is a British materials scientist and professor at the University of Cambridge. She is co-director of the Cambridge Centre for Medical Materials, where she studies materials that interact therapeutically with the body. Since October 2020 she has been joint head of the Department of Materials Science and Metallurgy at Cambridge.

== Early life and education ==
Cameron completed her PhD in physics at the University of Cambridge.

== Research and career ==
Cameron's research considers materials which interact therapeutically with the body. She is interested in musculoskeletal repair. Her research considers bioactive biodegradable composites, biodegradable polymers, tissue engineered scaffold and surface patterning. Cameron works with Serena Best on collagen scaffolds for the spin-out company Orthomimetics.

In 1993 she joined the Department of Materials Science and Metallurgy, University of Cambridge. Since 2006 she has co-led the Cambridge Centre for Medical Materials with Serena Best. The co-management makes Cameron and Best the first Engineering and Physical Sciences Research Council fellowship to job share. She was a founder member of the Pfizer Institute for Pharmaceutical Materials Science. She is a Fellow of Lucy Cavendish College, Cambridge.

== Honours and awards ==
- 2017 - United Kingdom Society for Biomaterials President's Prize
- 2017 - Institute of Materials, Minerals and Mining Griffith Medal & Prize
- 2019 - Institute of Physics Rosalind Franklin Medal and Prize, for "innovative application of physics to regenerative medicine and pharmaceutical delivery"
- 2021 - Engineering and Physical Sciences Suffrage Science award
- 2023 - Fellow of the Royal Academy of Engineering
