= Ipsita Roy =

British-Indian materials scientist

- Education: University of Cambridge; University of Delhi
- Scientific career
- Workplaces: University of Minnesota; Indian Institutes of Technology
- Thesis: Studies on methylmalonyl-CoA mutase. (1992)

Ipsita Roy is a British-Indian materials scientist who is a professor at the University of Sheffield. Her research considers natural polymers of bacterial origin for medical applications. She was elected to the New York Academy of Sciences in 1997 and serves as the Editor of the Journal of Chemical Technology & Biotechnology.

== Early life and education ==
Roy was an undergraduate student Delhi University. She was awarded a Inlaks Scholarship and the Overseas Research Students Award to complete her doctoral research at the University of Cambridge. Whilst at Cambridge, she was awarded the Churchill College Fellowship and the University of Cambridge Philosophical Society Fellowship. Roy was a postdoctoral student at the University of Minnesota, where she worked in fatty acid synthesis.

== Research and career ==
Roy started her independent career at the Indian Institutes of Technology in 1996, where she started to explore biodegradable polymers, which she formed from Streptomyces. After four years as an assistant professor at the IIT, Roy moved to the United Kingdom, where she joined the University of Westminster. She led the Applied Biotechnology Research Group in the School of Life Sciences. Roy moved to the University of Sheffield in 2019, where she is Professor of Biomaterials.

Roy investigates polyhydroxyalkanoates (PHAs), biocompatible, biodegradable polymers that are produced by bacteria. She has shown it is possible to form PHAs from Gram-positive bacteria which do not degrade into acidic products like polylactic acid or PLGA. At the same time, PHAs do not degrade in the bulk but on the surface, making them more stable than other biopolymers. Such polymers exist at two different molecular weights, which have very different materials properties; with short-chains being brittle and mid length chains being elastomeric. In regenerative medicine, PHAs with precise molecular weights can be used for different tissue types. This makes PHAs useful for medical applications such as tissue engineering and wound healing.

Roy has worked alongside Sian Harding, Carolyn Carr and Molly Stevens at Imperial College London on the design of cardiac patches based on PHAs as platforms for cell engraftment and the controlled delivery of pharmaceuticals using PHA microspheres.

== Selected publications ==
- Tajalli Keshavarz; Ipsita Roy (12 March 2010). "Polyhydroxyalkanoates: bioplastics with a green agenda". Current Opinion in Microbiology. 13 (3): 321–326. doi:10.1016/j.mib.2010.02.006. ISSN 1369-5274. PMID 20227907. Wikidata Q37708862.
- Superb K Misra; Sabeel P Valappil; Ipsita Roy; Aldo R Boccaccini (1 August 2006). "Polyhydroxyalkanoate (PHA)/inorganic phase composites for tissue engineering applications". Biomacromolecules. 7 (8): 2249–2258. doi:10.1021/bm060317c. ISSN 1525-7797. PMID 16903667. Wikidata Q36563385.
- Superb K Misra; Dirk Mohn; Tobias J Brunner; et al. (6 February 2008). "Comparison of nanoscale and microscale bioactive glass on the properties of P(3HB)/Bioglass composites". Biomaterials. 29 (12): 1750–1761. doi:10.1016/j.biomaterials.2007.12.040. ISSN 0142-9612. PMID 18255139. Wikidata Q40015872.
