= Mercedes Maroto-Valer =

Spanish engineer

Mercedes Maroto-Valer FREng is an engineer who holds the Robert Buchan Chair in Sustainable Energy Engineering at Heriot-Watt University. She is also director of the Research Centre for Carbon Solutions (RCCS) at Heriot-Watt University. Maroto-Valer was awarded the Philip Leverhulme Prize for Engineering in 2009. She is a Fellow of the Royal Society of Edinburgh, the Royal Academy of Engineering, the Royal Society of Chemistry and the Institution of Chemical Engineers.

== Life ==
Mercedes Maroto-Valer is an engineer working in Scotland. She earned her PhD at the University of Strathclyde in 1997, and conducted postdoctoral research at the University of Kentucky and Pennsylvania State University. She was appointed as a reader at the University of Nottingham in 2005. She joined Heriot-Watt University in 2012. Maroto-Valer is Champion and Director of the UK Industrial Decarbonisation Research and Innovation Centre (IDRIC). Maroto-Valer is Deputy Principal (Global Sustainability) at Heriot-Watt University. She is also director of the Research Centre for Carbon Solutions (RCCS) at Heriot-Watt University, where she holds the Robert Buchan Chair in Sustainable Energy Engineering. RCCS is a multidisciplinary centre delivering innovation for the wider deployment of low-carbon energy systems required for meeting net-zero targets. Maroto-Valer's research covers energy systems, CCUS carbon dioxide capture and storage, integration of hydrogen technologies and low carbon fuels.

== Awards ==
Maroto-Valer was elected a Fellow Royal Society of Chemistry in 2008, a Fellow of the Institute of Chemical Engineers in 2013, and a Fellow of the Royal Society of Edinburgh in 2015. She featured in the Royal Society of Edinburgh's 2019 Women in Science in Scotland exhibition, which celebrated some of Scotland’s leading female scientists. She received the 2009 Philip Leverhulme Prize for Engineering. In 2019 she was awarded an honorary doctorate by Delft University of Technology. In 2026 she was elected a Fellow of the Royal Academy of Engineering.
