= Susan Partridge =

Susan Partridge may refer to:

- Susan Partridge (athlete) (born 1980), British long-distance runner
- Susan Partridge (tennis) (born 1930), British tennis player
- Susan Partridge (engineer), aerospace engineer and businesswoman
- Susan Partridge, a character played by Amanda Donohoe in the film Foreign Body
