= Roger Reed =

Researcher and university teacher

Roger Reed FREng FIMMM
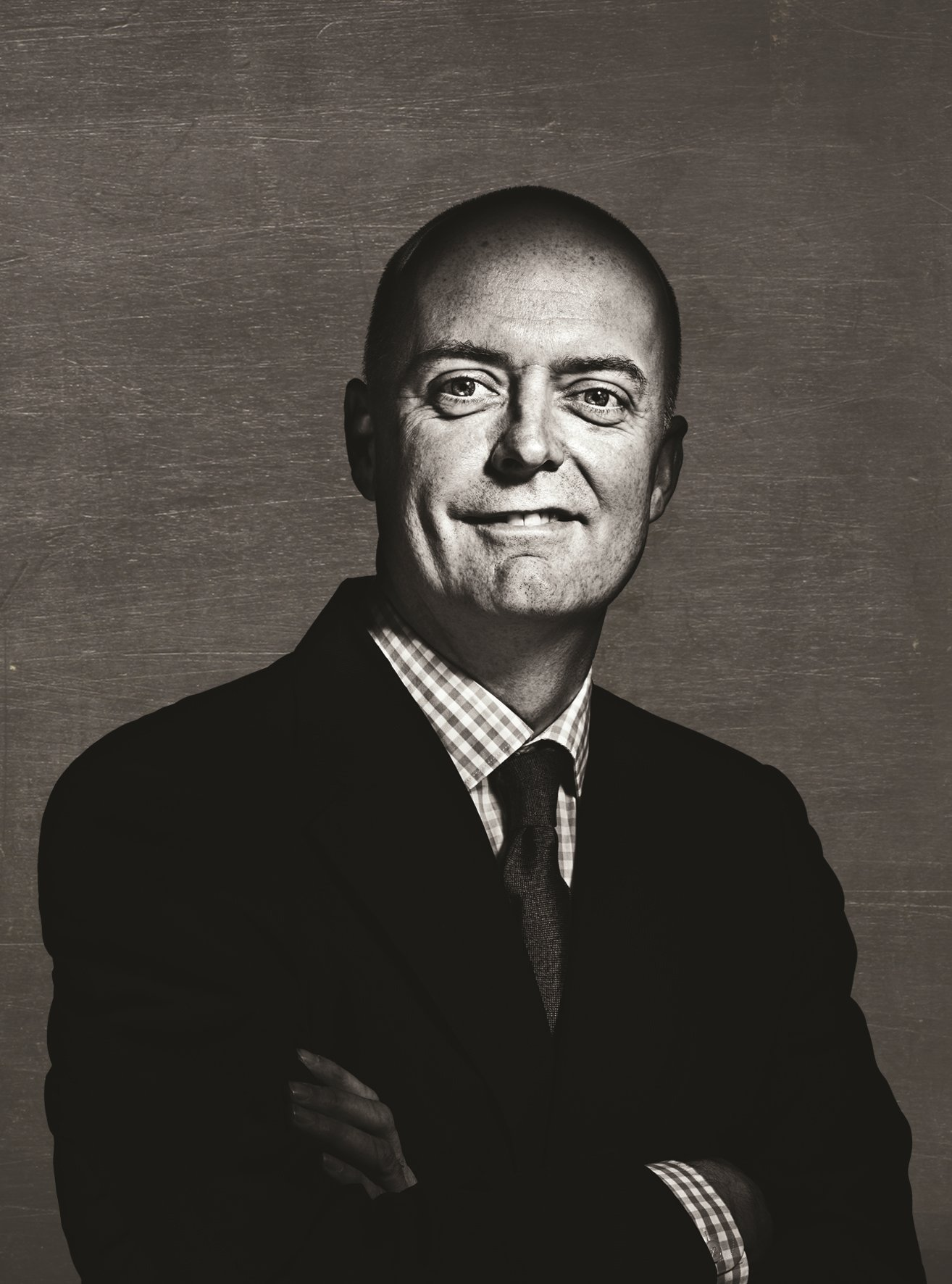
- Roger Charles Reed in 2016
- Born: Roger Charles Reed; November 1965 (age 60–61)
- Education: University of Cambridge (BA, PhD)
- Awards: 2002–2005 - Canada Research Chair, University of British Columbia; 2011 - Fellow of ASM International; 2016–2020 - Humboldt Research Award, Alexander von Humboldt Foundation; 2017 - Fellow of the Royal Academy of Engineering; 2025 – Ambassadeur, Centre National de la Recherche Scientifique (CNRS), France; 2025 – Royal Academy of Engineering Research Professorship
- Scientific career
- Fields: Engineering; Materials Science; Superalloys; Nickel
- Workplaces: University of Cambridge; Imperial College London; University of British Columbia; University of Birmingham; University of Oxford
- Thesis: The characterisation and modelling of multipass steel weld heat-affected zones. (1990)
- Doctoral advisor: Harshad Bhadeshia
- Notable students: Howard Stone Cambridge (current); David Dye Imperial (current); Alessandro Mottura Birmingham (current); Yuanbo Tang Birmingham (current); Chinnapat Panwisawas Queen Mary (current); Paraskevas Kontis BAM (current); Daniel Barba UPM (current); Enrique Alabort Alloyed Ltd (current)
- Website: eng.ox.ac.uk/people/roger-reed/

Roger Charles Reed is a British-born materials scientist and engineer. He has spent his career teaching and researching in universities - Imperial College London, Cambridge, the University of British Columbia, Birmingham and Oxford. Working out of the Departments of Engineering and Materials Science, he currently holds the position of Professor of Engineering Science and Materials at the University of Oxford and is a Fellow at St. Anne's College, Oxford.

His research focuses on high temperature materials used in the aerospace, aeronautics, and power generation sectors. He is particularly well known for his work on the nickel-based superalloys, a specialised class of materials which can operate at temperatures above 1000°C in the corrosive environments found in the hottest parts of the aircraft engine. His textbook in this field - `The Superalloys: Fundamentals and Applications’ - was published by Cambridge University Press in 2006. Reed is also known for his pioneering 'alloys-by-design' work as well his expertise in alloy processing such as 3D printing, melting and welding, and the establishment of structure/property relationships in these materials. In 2017, he founded Alloyed Ltd (renamed from OxMet Technologies) as a spin-out from this research at the University of Oxford.

== Early life and education ==
Reed grew up in Catford, south-east London and is a lifelong fan of Crystal Palace FC. Aged 11 at his local primary school, he won a scholarship to attend Dulwich College. He entered the University of Cambridge where he read Natural Sciences and studied subsequently for a PhD under Prof Harshad Bhadeshia, working on multipass steel welding. He was the first of his family to attend university. He has credited his parents – who had their education disrupted by World War II – for instilling in him his enthusiasm for learning, education and scientific discovery.

== Research and Translation into Industrial Practice ==
Reed has been, with his research team and collaborators, influential in building partnerships between academia and industry. He has worked with companies such as Rolls-Royce, Siemens, IHI, Mitsubishi Heavy Industries, Safran and MTU. A major part of his work has involved the building of mathematical models for the relevant manufacturing routes such as welding, heat-treatment, solidification processing and casting, 3D printing, forging and sheet melt forming. He has talked actively about the dream of simulating all of the important manufacturing routes accurately, as a route towards process optimisation. These simulations are known as digital twins.

Reed's university spin-out Alloyed Ltd (renamed from the original OxMet Technologies) specialises in the alloy design needed for the 3D printing (additive manufacturing) process which is steadily revolutionising the way that structural components of complicated design are produced. As of 2026, Alloyed had grown to >300 employees and an annual turnover of >£30m pa; it has (twice) been included on the Sunday Times' listing of the UK's fastest growing companies.

== Career and research ==
Over a career of more than 30 years, Reed has strived to build international relationships between technologists across the world, believing in the power of science and engineering to provide common ground, mutual understanding and respect for all - regardless of international background.

From 1994 to 2012, Reed was active in North America through the TMS organisation, notably organising the International Symposium on Superalloys and editing its conference proceedings. For this and related work he was elected Fellow of the American Society for Materials in 2011. Between 2002 to 2005, Reed worked as Canada Research Chair at the University of British Columbia (UBC), Vancouver, Canada.

From 2006 to 2012 he worked in the Department of Metallurgy and Materials at the University of Birmingham, serving as Director of Research, before moving to Oxford in 2013 to take up the role of Professor of Engineering Science and Materials where he is a fellow at St. Anne's College.

In 2010, Reed was part of the founding team which established the European Symposium for Superalloys which takes place every four years. He organised the meeting held in Oxford in 2018.

Between 2016 and 2020, Reed worked closely with the Max Planck Institute in Dusseldorf, Germany after being awarded the Humboldt Prize. Several joint research projects were carried out and several German students came to Oxford to work in his laboratory.

In 2017, Reed was asked by the Japanese government to lead the Tatara Project which has involved building the NEXTA (Next Generation Tatara) Centre at Shimane University, Matsue, Japan. Reed acts as Director of NEXTA, guiding its advanced metallurgical research—and thus building a global hub for metallic materials, bridging the traditional Japanese ironmaking (Tatara) process towards modern metallurgical engineering.

In 2025, Reed was elected Ambassadeur to the Centre National Recherches Scientific (CNRS) of La Republique de France. As part of this arrangement, he holds a Visiting Professorship at ENSMA in Poitiers, France. He supervises several French students there along with Professor Jonathan Cormier.

Reed works closely with the UK’s Royal Academy of Engineering (RAE), having elected to its Fellowship in 2017. He has been a supporter of the RAE’s Engineering Leadership Programme, which provides scholarships to undergraduate students . In 2025, he was awarded a Royal Academy of Engineering Research Professorship, which allowed him to spend time as Chief Scientist at the High Temperature Research Centre (HTRC), a collaboration between Rolls-Royce plc and the University of Birmingham.
