= Panagiota Angeli =

Panagiota Angeli FREng FIChemE
- Education: Imperial College London; National Technical University of Athens
- Scientific career
- Workplaces: University College London; National Technical University of Athens
- Thesis: Liquid-liquid dispersed flows in horizontal pipes (1996)

Panagiota Angeli is a Greek engineer who is a Professor of Chemical Engineering at University College London. Her research considers experimental and digital analysis of multi-phase flows. She is committed to making engineering more inclusive, and led a successful application for a gold Athena SWAN award. She was elected Fellow of the Royal Academy of Engineering in 2025.

== Early life and education ==
Angeli is from Greece. She became interested in science at a young age, and specifically enjoyed using science to solve complex problems. She studied chemical engineering at the National Technical University of Athens, where she remained as a Research Assistant. She moved to the United Kingdom for her doctoral research, where she worked on multiphase flows at Imperial College London. At Imperial, she became interested in two-phase liquid systems, which was relevant to the oil and gas industry. She was awarded a Leverhulme Trust Fellowship, and started work on process intensification. Her fellowship looked to separate metals for spent nuclear fuel reprocessing.

== Research and career ==
Angeli is a Professor of Chemical Engineering at University College London, having joined the department in 1996, and was awarded an Esso Fellowship in 1998. She looks to understand how small scale interactions impact the behaviour of complex flows. She examines how surfactants and non-Newtonian rheologies impact microdrop formation, and the optimimum composition of complex formulations. Angeli combines advanced characterisation techniques, AI data-driven simulations and digital tools to understand multiphase flows. Angeli is interested in metals recycling and the treatment of electronic waste.

=== Academic service ===
Angeli led the Department of Chemical Engineering's successful application for a gold Athena SWAN award.

== Awards and honours ==
- 2010 Elected Fellow of the Institution of Chemical Engineers
- 2025 Elected Fellow of the Royal Academy of Engineering

== Selected publications ==
- P Angeli; G.F Hewitt (July 2000). "Flow structure in horizontal oil–water flow". International Journal of Multiphase Flow. 26 (7): 1117–1140. Bibcode:2000IJMF...26.1117A. doi:10.1016/s0301-9322(99)00081-6. ISSN 0301-9322. Zbl 1137.76518. Wikidata Q60590109.
- D Gobby; P Angeli; A Gavriilidis (15 February 2001). "Mixing characteristics of T-type microfluidic mixers". Journal of Micromechanics and Microengineering. 11 (2): 126–132. Bibcode:2001JMiMi..11..126G. doi:10.1088/0960-1317/11/2/307. ISSN 0960-1317. Wikidata Q60590107.
- Volker Hessel; Panagiota Angeli; Asterios Gavriilidis; Holger Löwe (December 2005). "Gas−Liquid and Gas−Liquid−Solid Microstructured Reactors: Contacting Principles and Applications". Industrial & Engineering Chemistry Research. 44 (25): 9750–9769. doi:10.1021/ie0503139. ISSN 0888-5885. Wikidata Q60590095.
