= Hanna Cho =

South Korean and American mechanical engineer

Hanna Cho is a South Korean and American mechanical engineer, and an associate professor in the Department of Mechanical and Aerospace Engineering at the Ohio State University. Her research concerns dynamics at the microscale and nanoscale, including micro-electromechanical systems and especially microelectromechanical system oscillators.

== Education and career ==
Cho was a student of mechanical engineering at Yonsei University, where she earned bachelor's and master's degrees in 2002 and 2004. She went to the University of Illinois Urbana-Champaign for doctoral study in mechanical science and engineering, completing her Ph.D. in 2012. Her dissertation, Intentional nonlinearity in the design of dynamic micro/nanomechanical resonators via nanomaterial-integrated fabrication, was jointly directed by Min-Feng Yu and Alexander F. Vakakis.

After postdoctoral research at the University of Illinois, working there with William P. King, Cho became an assistant professor in the Department of Mechanical Engineering at Texas Tech University. In 2015, she moved to her present position at the Ohio State University, where she directs the Micro/Nano Multiphysical Dynamics Lab.

== Recognition ==
Cho was the 2021 recipient of the C.D. Mote Jr. Early Career Award, given by ASME for research excellence in vibration and acoustics. She was named as an ASME Fellow in 2023.

The Journal of Micromechanics and Microengineering gave Cho their 2023 Emerging Leader Award.
