= Rachel Thomson =

British engineer

Rachel Thomson FREng FIMMM
- Born: Rachel Clare Thomson
- Education: University of Cambridge (BA, MA, PhD)
- Scientific career
- Fields: Physical Metallurgy; Microstructural Characterisation; Materials Modelling; Nickel based Superalloys; High Temperature Steels
- Workplaces: Loughborough University
- Thesis: Carbide composition changes in power plant steels as a method of remanent creep life prediction (1992)
- Doctoral advisor: Harshad Bhadeshia
- Website: www.lboro.ac.uk/departments/materials/staff/rachel-thomson/

Rachel Clare Thomson FREng FIMMM is a professor of Materials Science and Engineering, and Pro Vice Chancellor of Teaching at Loughborough University. She is known for her expertise in measuring and predicting the behaviour of materials for high temperature power generation, as well as the development of higher education and research programmes.

== Education ==
Thomson read the Natural Sciences Tripos at Newnham College, Cambridge (BA 1989, MA 1992). In 1992 Thomson subsequently completed her PhD in Materials, also at the University of Cambridge, on the composition of carbide supervised by Harshad Bhadeshia and funded by National Power and the Science and Engineering Research Council (SERC).

== Research and career ==
After Thomson received her PhD she continued to work in Cambridge as a postdoctoral research fellow at Darwin College, Cambridge, before moving to a lectureship in the Department of Materials at Loughborough University in 1995. In 2002, she was promoted to a Personal Chair (i.e. full Professor) and in 2006, she became Director of the Materials Research School. Her career at Loughborough progressed further as in 2011 she became Head of Department, in 2015 she became Dean of the School of Aeronautical, Automotive, Chemical and Materials Engineering, and from 2016, Thomson has been the Pro Vice-Chancellor of teaching. Her research has been funded by the Engineering and Physical Sciences Research Council (EPSRC).

=== Awards and honours ===
Her awards include:

- 2018 East Midlands Inspirational Female Leader of the Year and Outstanding Woman in Science, Technology, Engineering and mathematics (STEM) – East Midlands Women's Awards (EMWA).
- 2018 Elected a Fellow of the Royal Academy of Engineering (FREng)
- 2009 Elected a Fellow of the Institute of Materials, Minerals and Mining
- 2005 Rosenhain Medal, Institute of Materials, Minerals and Mining
- 2003 Fellowship from the Japan Society for the Promotion of Science
- 1994 E.W. Mueller Outstanding Young Scientist Medal, 42nd International Field Emission Symposium

== Selected publications ==
- Thomson, R.C; Miller, M.K (1998). "Carbide precipitation in martensite during the early stages of tempering Cr- andMo-containing low alloy steels". Acta Materialia. 46 (6): 2203–2213. Bibcode:1998AcMat..46.2203T. doi:10.1016/S1359-6454(97)00420-5. ISSN 1359-6454.
- Roth, H. A.; Davis, C. L.; Thomson, R. C. (1997). "Modeling solid solution strengthening in nickel alloys". Metallurgical and Materials Transactions A. 28 (6): 1329–1335. Bibcode:1997MMTA...28.1329R. doi:10.1007/s11661-997-0268-2. ISSN 1073-5623. S2CID 136526947.
- Thomson, R. C.; Bhadeshia, H. K. D. H. (1992). "Carbide precipitation in 12Cr1MoV power plant steel". Metallurgical Transactions A. 23 (4): 1171–1179. Bibcode:1992MTA....23.1171T. doi:10.1007/BF02665048. ISSN 0360-2133. S2CID 136827748.
