= Elizabeth Tanner =

British biomedical engineer

Elizabeth Tanner OBE FREng FRSE
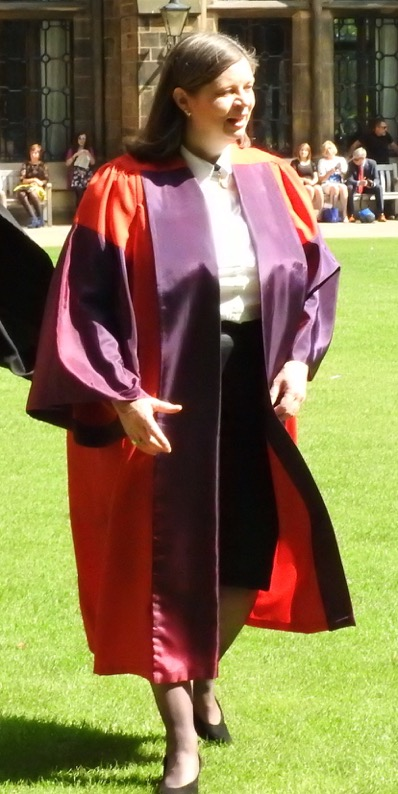
- Prof Elizabeth Tanner at the University of Glasgow graduation day
- Born: Kathleen Elizabeth Tanner; Farnham, Surrey
- Education: University of Oxford (PhD)
- Scientific career
- Fields: Biomedical Engineering
- Workplaces: Queen Mary University of London University of Glasgow
- Thesis: The Design of a Fracture Movement Transducer (1983)
- Website: www.gla.ac.uk/schools/engineering/staff/ktanner/

Kathleen Elizabeth Tanner OBE FREng FRSE (born 20 March 1957) is the Bonfield Professor of Biomedical Materials at Queen Mary University of London. Her research focusses on developing materials with particular biological and mechanical properties for use medicine, particularly those used for bone replacement. Tanner developed HAPEX, a bone mineral composite biomaterial, which was used in over half a million middle ear transplants in the 1990s.

Tanner also developed Scotland's first undergraduate degree in biomedical engineering at the University of Glasgow, these degrees started in 2010.

== Education ==
After being encouraged by her school headmistress at Wycombe Abbey to pursue engineering, Tanner attended Lady Margaret Hall at the University of Oxford where she completed a bachelor's degree in 1979, and then DPhil in engineering science within the Nuffield Orthopaedic Engineering Centre. Tanner's PhD studied movement at fracture sites in patients with lower leg fractures.

== Scientific career ==
In 1983 Tanner joined the Department of Materials at Queen Mary University of London. She was appointed Professor of Biomedical Materials in 1998. During this time, Tanner's research was focussed on materials for bone replacement and augmentation. From 1998 Tanner commenced a visiting professorship in biomechanics and biomaterials position at the Department of Orthopaedics, Lund University Hospital, Sweden where she held a Hedda Anderson Adjunct Professorship. From 1998 to 2001, she was the Associate Director of the IRC in Biomedical Materials and was the Dean of Engineering from 1999 to 2000. Tanner joined the University of Glasgow in 2007 as Professor of Biomaterials. In September 2018 she returned to Queen Mary University of London.

From 2016 Tanner led a two-year study funded by Action Medical Research to help babies with breathing difficulties by developing a biodegradable stent. During her career, she has edited three books and published over 160 papers and chapters.

== HAPEX patent ==
One of the bone replacement materials developed by Tanner was used in middle ear transplants. This material is HAPEX, which is made of polyethylene polymers (plastic-like material) with bone-like ceramics as the filler phase. This material has been used to restore hearing in patients since 1988.

== Honours and leadership roles ==
- 2020: President of the 11th World Biomaterials Congress taking place on-line
- 2017: Awarded PhD (Hon Caus) by Faculty of Medicine, Lund University
- 2016: awarded Officer of the Order of the British Empire (OBE) in New Year's Honours List
- 2015: elected Fellow of the Royal Society of Edinburgh (FRSE)
- 2015: elected Fellow of the European Alliance of Medical and Biological Engineering and Science (FEAMBES)
- 2006: elected Fellow of the Royal Academy of Engineering
- 2004: elected Fellow Biomaterials Science and Engineering (FBSE) awarded by International Union of Societies in Biomaterials Science and Engineering
- 2005–2009: secretary of the Executive Committee of the European Society for Biomaterials
- 2001–2009: member of the Executive Committee of the European Society for Biomaterials
