= Jeni =

Jeni is a feminine given name, sometimes short for Jenifer, which may refer to:

- Jeni Barnett (born 1949), English TV presenter
- Jeni Bojilova-Pateva (1878–1955), Bulgarian teacher, writer, women's rights activist, suffragist and peace activist
- Jeni Couzyn (born 1942), South African feminist poet
- Jeni Klugman (born 1964), American economist
- Jeni Le Gon (1916–2012), American dancer, dance instructor and actress born Jennie Ligon
- Jeni Mawter (born 1959), Australian children's author
- Jenifer Jeni Mundy (born 1964), English yachtswoman and telecoms engineer and executive
- Jenifer Jeni Tennison (born 1972), British software engineer and consultant

== Fictional characters ==
- Jennie "Jeni" Sicat, a character from the 2026 Philippine musical drama Born to Shine

== See also ==
- Jenny (disambiguation)
