= Harshad Bhadeshia =

Indian-British metallurgist

Sir Harshad Bhadeshia FRS FREng FIMMM
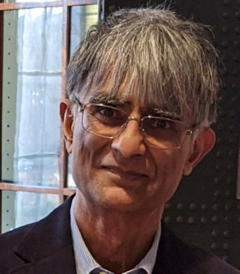
- Born: Harshad Kumar Dharamshi Hansraj Bhadeshia; 27 November 1953 (age 72); Kenya
- Other name: Harry Bhadeshia
- Education: City of London Polytechnic (BSc); University of Cambridge (PhD)
- Awards: Armourers and Brasiers' Company Prize (1997); Knight Bachelor (2015)
- Scientific career
- Fields: Metallurgy; Phase transformations in steel; Computational modelling, Neural networks; Bainite
- Workplaces: University of Cambridge, Queen Mary University of London
- Thesis: Theory and significance of retained austenite in steels (1980)
- Doctoral advisor: David V. Edmonds
- Doctoral students: Roger Reed; Rachel Thomson
- Website: www.phase-trans.msm.cam.ac.uk/Bhadeshia.html

Sir Harshad "Harry" Kumar Dharamshi Hansraj Bhadeshia FRS FREng FIMMM (born 27 November 1953) is an Indian-British metallurgist and Emeritus Tata Steel Professor of Metallurgy at the University of Cambridge. In 2022 he joined Queen Mary University of London as Professor of Metallurgy.

== Education and early life ==
Bhadeshia was born in Kenya to Indian parents, who were carpenters. Bhadeshia's interest in science started when he visited the battery shop where his father worked. He was educated at the Kongoni Primary School. During the time that Kenya was a colony and protectorate of Britain, this was the Nairobi South Primary School, but in 1963 morphed to its new name under the auspices of the Government of Kenya (kongoni is a Swahili word referring to an African antelope). He then went on to the Highway Secondary School, also in Nairobi.

He moved with his family to the United Kingdom in 1970 and joined the British Oxygen Company in Edmonton as a technician in their metallurgical quality control laboratory. This allowed him to study part-time at the East Ham College of Technology in London, for the Ordinary National Certificate in Science. He then moved to the quality control laboratory at Murex Welding Processes, and they sponsored him to study at the City of London Polytechnic where he graduated with a Bachelor of Science degree in 1976. Professor Robert Honeycombe was at the time the external examiner for the course at the Polytechnic and encouraged him to join his research group at the University of Cambridge. He was admitted to the University of Cambridge to work on the theory and significance of retained austenite in steels and obtained his PhD in 1980 supervised by David V. Edmonds, in Honeycombe's Steel Research Group. The nature of austenite that is retained depends on the preceding phase transformations – as a research student he focused therefore on unravelling the choreography of atoms when austenite undergoes bainitic or martensitic transformation.

== Career and research ==
Bhadeshia's research is concerned with the theory of solid-state transformations in metals, particularly multicomponent steels, with the goal of creating novel alloys and processes with the minimum use of resources.

Following his PhD, he worked as a Science Research Council Research Fellow until 1981, when he joined the academic staff of the Department of Materials Science and Metallurgy at the University of Cambridge. He is the author or co-author of more than 650 published papers in the field of metallurgy and several books.

In the 1990s, he worked with British Steel plc on a carbide-free, silicon-rich bainitic steel that was used for rails in the Channel Tunnel and later on a high-performance armour steel for the British Ministry of Defence.

In 2006, he was awarded the Bessemer Gold Medal by the Institute of Materials, Minerals and Mining for "outstanding services to the Steel Industry". In November 2008, he was appointed the first Tata Steel Professor of Metallurgy following a donation by Tata Steel to endow this chair on a permanent basis at the University of Cambridge and he established and took the lead of the new "SKF University Technology Centre", between SKF and the University of Cambridge to conduct research in the field of the physical metallurgy of bearing steels, over the period 2009–2019.

During 2005–18, as the Founding Director of the Computational Metallurgy Laboratory, he helped create the Graduate Institute for Ferrous Technology at POSTECH in the Republic of Korea.

In December 2023, he featured on The Life Scientific, the BBC Radio 4 programme hosted by Jim Al-Khalili, in an episode discussing his research.

== Teaching ==
Bhadeshia has developed a wide range of freely accessible teaching materials on metallurgy and associated subjects. The subject matters cover crystallography, metals and alloys, steels in particular, phase transformation theory, thermodynamics, kinetics, mathematical modelling in materials science, information theory, process modelling, thermal analysis, ethics and natural philosophy.

The resources include lecture notes, slides, videos, algorithms, review articles, books, cartoons, audio files, experimental data archives, image libraries, seminars, examples classes, question sheets and answers, automated learning (MOOCS), and a diverse range of other electronic resources. A YouTube channel (bhadeshia123) contains in excess of 1400 educational videos.

The resources are archived as a permanent record by the British Library in an open access mode. For "outstanding teaching activities", he was conferred the Adams Memorial Membership Award of the American Welding Society during 2007.

== Editorial positions ==
Bhadhesia has served as editor for the following journals:

- Materials Science and Engineering: A
- Materials Science and Technology
- Science and Technology of Welding and Joining
- Biographical Memoirs of Fellows of the Royal Society

== Awards and honours ==
- 1992: Hume Rothery Prize
- 1994: Rosenhain Medal & Prize
- 1997: Royal Society Armourers and Brasiers' Company Prize
- 1998: Elected a Fellow of the Royal Society (FRS)
- 2001: Reaumur Medal of the French Society of Metallurgy and Materials
- 2002: Fellow of the Royal Academy of Engineering (FREng)
- 2003: Aditya Birla Chair, Indian Institute of Science, Bangalore
- 2004: Foreign Fellow of the Indian National Academy of Engineering
- 2006: Bessemer Gold Medal
- 2008: Tata Steel Professor of Metallurgy
- 2008: Fellow of the American Welding Society
- 2009: Director of the SKF University Technology Centre
- 2010: Honorary Member of the Iron and Steel Institute of Japan
- 2015: Knight Bachelor in the Queen's 2015 Birthday Honours
- 2016: Honorary Fellowship of The Welding Institute
- 2017: Adolf Martens Medal, Germany
- 2017: Membre d'Honneur de la SF2M
- 2018: Foreign Fellow, The National Science Academy of India
- 2019: Lee Hsun Lecture Award, Institute of Metals Research, Chinese Academy of Sciences
- 2022: Henry Clifton Sorby Award, International Metallographic Society, ASM International
- 2024: Elected International Fellow of the Chinese Society for Metals
- 2025: William Menelaus Medal
- 2025: Nelson W. Taylor Lecture
- 2025: Edward de Mille Campbell Memorial Lecture
