= Boccaccini =

Boccaccini is an Italian surname. Notable people with the surname include:

- Aldo R. Boccaccini (born 1962), nuclear engineer and material scientist
- Matteo Boccaccini (born 1993), Italian footballer
