= Gourvenec =

Gourvenec is a surname. Notable people with the surname include:

- Gwendolyn Gourvenec, French actress
- Susan Gourvenec, British geoscientist

Another spelling is Gourvennec. This was the surname of Camille Gourvennec, French spy.
