= Masui =

Masui (written: 増井 or 桝井) is a Japanese surname. Notable people with the surname include:

- Hirotoshi Masui (増井 浩俊, born 1984), Japanese baseball player
- Toshiki Masui (桝井 俊樹, born 1969), Japanese equestrian
- Yoshio Masui (増井 禎夫, born 1931), Japanese biologist
