= Roger Reid =

Roger Reid may refer to:

- Roger Reid (basketball) (born 1946), American college basketball coach
- Roger Reid (politician) (born 1967), Canadian politician

== See also ==
- Roger Reed, British metallurgist
