= Thornley =

Thornley may refer to:

== Places ==
- Thornley, Durham, a village in County Durham, England
- Thornley, Weardale, another village in County Durham, England
- Thornley-with-Wheatley, a civil parish in Lancashire, England

== Other uses ==
- Thornley (surname)
- Thornley Stoker, 1st Baronet (1845–1912), Irish medical writer, anatomist and surgeon
- Thornley (band) (founded 2002), a Canadian post-grunge/hard rock band

== See also ==
- Thornley v. United States (1885), a U.S. Supreme Court case relating to military pay
- Thornlea (disambiguation)
- Thornleigh, a suburb of Sydney, New South Wales, Australia
- Thornlie, a suburb of Perth, Western Australia
