= Vakakis =

Vakakis is a surname. Notable people with the surname include:

- Alexander F. Vakakis, American mechanical engineer
- George Vakakis (born 1943), Australian weightlifter
