= Roni Savage =

Roni Savage OBE FREng FICE
- Education: University of Portsmouth; University of Exeter

Roni Savage is a British engineer who is CEO of Jomas Associates. She is a non-executive board member of the Department for Business, Innovation, Science and Trade and serves on the Prime Minister's Advisory Committee for The King's Awards for Enterprise.

== Early life and education ==
Savage graduated from the University of Portsmouth with a bachelor's in engineering geology and geotechnics. She subsequently completed a master's degree with distinction in Environmental Management at the University of Exeter. Savage eventually returned to her alma mater to receive an Honorary Doctorate.

== Life and career ==
Savage is a construction engineer. During her engineering career, she has worked on major UK construction and infrastructure projects, including the widening of the A406 and M25, as well as a range of building and infrastructure developments.

Savage's work has included the development of remediation strategies for contaminated and brownfield sites, enabling land to be reclaimed for subsequent development. She established her own construction business in 2009. Jomas Associates help the construction industry identify sustainable solutions for contaminated land and to solve their geotechnical challenges.

Savage serves as Policy Chair for Construction and Infrastructure at the Federation of Small Businesses and has participated in UK government business advisory groups. She is also Vice Chair of YMCA St Paul's Group, a charity providing services and support for young people. Savage was appointed non-executive board member of the Department for Business, Innovation, Science and Trade in 2024.

In 2018, Savage was named as a champion of UK business women. Savage was elected Fellow of the Institution of Civil Engineers in 2019 and the Royal Academy of Engineering in 2024. She was appointed an Order of the British Empire in December 2025 for services to young people, the construction industry and business.

== Personal life ==
Savage's ancestors immigrated to the United Kingdom from Nigeria. She is a mother to three sons.
