= Rosemary Francis =

British engineer and technologist

- Engineering career
- Awards: FREng

Rosemary Francis FREng is a British engineer and technologist. She is best known for her work in the field of supercomputers and is CTO at CommonAI Compute, a cloud computing startup founded by Sir Andy Hopper. Francis obtained her PhD in computer architecture, while studying at the University of Cambridge. Following her education, Francis co-founded Ellexus to build tools for managing complex tools chains required during the design of semiconductors. In 2020, the startup she founded was acquired by US-based Altair Engineering for an undisclosed sum. Following the acquisition, Francis became Chief Scientist at the tech engineering firm.

She is a member of Raspberry Pi Foundation, and became a Royal Academy of Engineering Fellow in 2023.
