= List of fellows of the Royal Society elected in 1998 =

Fellows of the Royal Society elected in 1998.

== Fellows ==
1. Brian Stewart Worthington (d. 2007)
2. Colin Atkinson
3. David James Purslove Barker
4. Jean Duthie Beggs
5. Harshad Bhadeshia
6. David Keith Bowen
7. Roger John Cashmore
8. Andrew John Casson
9. Thomas Cavalier-Smith
10. David William Clarke
11. Enrico Coen
12. Stephen Arthur Cook
13. Sir Peter Robert Crane
14. Richard Michael Denton
15. Raymond Allen Dwek
16. Charles Porter Ellington
17. Richard Bailey Flavell
18. Kenneth Charles Freeman
19. Brian Mellor Greenwood
20. John Philip Grime
21. David Colin Hanna
22. Geoffrey Everest Hinton
23. George Steven Martin
24. Raghunath Anant Mashelkar
25. Yoshio Masui
26. Ronald Charles Newman
27. Mark Brian Pepys
28. Trevor Charles Platt
29. Raymond Alan Plumb
30. Richard John Puddephatt
31. Philip Charles Ruffles
32. Anthony Walter Segal
33. Ashoke Sen
34. Jonathan Sprent
35. James Staunton
36. Sir John Michael Taylor
37. Robert Kemeys Thomas
38. Cheryll Anne Tickle
39. Srinivasa Varadhan
40. Bernard John Wood

== Foreign members ==
1. John Edward Casida
2. Elias James Corey
3. Walter Kohn
4. Oliver Smithies
5. Rolf Martin Zinkernagel
