= Yoge Patel =

British engineer

Yoge Patel FREng
- Education: York University
- Engineering career
- Significant advance: Automation and autonomous systems

Yoge Patel FREng is a British engineer and expert in autonomy and autonomous systems. She is the founder of Blue Bear Group, Yoge stepped down as CEO in February 2025.

== Early life and education ==
After Patel was advised against studying maths at sixth form college, she opted to study computing and then studied Electronics and Systems Engineering at Loughborough University. She studied for her Ph.D. in Flight Control Engineering at New York University.

== Career & research ==
Patel is an expert in dual-use autonomous systems for more than 30 years experience. She began her career in the defence industry at Defense and Research Agency, the UK Govt Labs and then QinetiQ, where she was responsible for technology innovation, business development and technical strategy. After a decade at QinetiQ, Patel joined the Robotic & Autonomous Systems industry startup, Blue Bear Research Systems. The startup went onto become a pioneer in the British drone industry, fostering applications in both civil and military domains. In 2015, its drone Riser was used to reduce the inspection time needed for suspected damages to passenger aircraft from up to 10 hours to 20 minutes on a single aircraft. In 2018, Patel's Blue Bear pioneered an aerial corridor in Bedfordshire for the testing of unmanned automated drones in collaboration with Cranfield University.

In 2019 the company's pioneering work on swarming USA was adopted by the Royal Air Force to provide next generation capability to the UK's new 216 Squadron.

In January 2021 a ten-member consortium to develop a template for automated, zero-carbon regional transport aircraft networks by 2027. The consortium, known as Hydrogen, Electric, Automated Regional Transport (Heart), comprises airports, airlines, aircraft manufacturers, airport architects, engineering and software companies and a university.

Also in 2021, the company led a seven-member consortium based in the UK. The consortium is known as Integrated Flight Control, Energy Storage and Propulsion Technologies for Electric Aircraft (Inception), was formed with the goal to produce engines that produce zero tailpipe emissions and lower noise signatures.

Since May 2021 Patel has served as a member of the UK Government's Expert Advisory Panel for CAVPASS programme. The programme aims to improve strategy for the implementation of automated vehicles on British roads. In 2022 she was elected a fellow by the Royal Academy of Engineering.
