= Leigh-Ann Russell =

Scottish engineer (born 1975)

Leigh-Ann Russell FREng FRSE
- Occupation: Engineer

Leigh-Ann Russell FREng FRSE is a Scottish engineer. She worked as an executive at BP as executive vice president of innovation & engineering until she resigned in 2024 to join the financial services firm BNY as head of engineering and CIO as part of their executive team.

== Biography ==
Leigh-Ann Russell, a native of Aberdeen, was educated at the University of Aberdeen, where she obtained a Bachelor of Science degree in mechanical engineering. Her career in engineering began in the late 1990s, beginning as an executive at the service company Schlumberger.

Russell joined the energy company BP, where she served as engineering manager and operations manager for the North Sea and as global vice president of technical functions. In June 2020, amidst supply chain issues during the COVID-19 pandemic, Russell publicly objected to the practice of mailing letters to suppliers demanding cost reduction, arguing that waste reduction was a more productive alternative. Russell was promoted from head of procurement and supply chain management to senior vice president of procurement on 1 March 2018. On 1 March 2022, Russell was promoted to executive vice president of innovation and engineering; that position has been described as encompassing responsibilities commonly associated with a chief digital officer, chief technology officer, and chief scientific officer.

In June 2024, Russell was appointed chief information officer and global head of engineering at BNY and a member of the firm's executive committee, joining the company in September 2024.

Since joining BNY, Russell has spoken publicly about the firm's artificial intelligence adoption, including appearances at the Microsoft AI Tour in New York City alongside Microsoft executives. In 2025, BNY announced a multiyear relationship with OpenAI intended to enhance its internal enterprise AI platform. In late 2025, reporting described BNY expanding its AI platform with Google Cloud's agentic AI capabilities as part of its broader AI programme.

Outside of engineering, she also serves as a non-executive director for the manufacturing company Hill & Smith.

Russell was elected a Fellow of the Royal Academy of Engineering in 2019. She was elected a Fellow of the Royal Society of Edinburgh in 2022. She was also made an honorary Professor of Practice at Queen's University Belfast in 2022. She is also a Fellow of the Energy Institute and a Chartered Petroleum Engineer.
