= Barbara Shollock =

Metallurgist

Barbara Ann Shollock FREng is a metallurgist focusing on nickel-based superalloys and other advanced alloys, including their mechanical properties and the growth and selection of crystal grains in their formation. Educated in the US and England, she works in England as head of the Department of Engineering at King's College London.

== Education and career ==
Shollock was an engineering student as an undergraduate at Lehigh University, became a researcher at AT&T Bell Labs, and while at Bell Labs earned a master's degree from Lehigh. She completed a doctorate at the University of Oxford.

After postdoctoral research in Keble College, Oxford as a Rolls Royce Junior Research Fellow from 1988 to 1991, she joined the academic staff at Imperial College London. She became a senior lecturer there, before moving to the University of Warwick in 2014 as the holder of a Tata Steel Chair in Advanced Characterisation and Coatings. In 2019 she moved again, to her present position at King's College London.

== Recognition ==
Shollock was elected as a Fellow of the Royal Academy of Engineering in 2023, "for her research contributions to the fundamental, theoretical and experimental understanding, development, and performance enhancement of advanced metallic alloys".
