= Thornley (surname) =

Thornley is a surname. Notable people with the surname include:

- Ben Thornley (born 1975), English footballer
- David Thornley (1935–1978), Irish politician
- Douglas Thornley (born 1959), American architect
- Georges William Thornley (1857–1935), French painter and printmaker
- Ian Thornley, leader of Thornley, a Canadian rock band
- Irvine Thornley (1883–1955), English footballer
- Jeni Thornley (born 1948), Australian feminist documentary filmmaker
- John Thornley (footballer, born 1885), English footballer
- John Thornley (footballer, born 1875), English footballer
- Kerry Wendell Thornley (1938–1998), American Discordian, anarchist, objectivist, Zen Buddhist
- Patricia Thornley, British engineer
- Peter Thornley (born 1941), English professional wrestler who fought under the name Kendo Nagasaki
- Victoria Thornley (born 1987), Welsh rower
