= Suzanne Farid =

British biochemical and system engineer

Professor Suzanne Farid CBE FREng FIChemE
- Engineering career
- Discipline: Biochemical Engineering
- Institutions: University College London

Suzanne Farid is an engineer who specialises in Biochemical and Systems Engineering. She is currently professor of bioprocess systems engineering and head of the department of biochemical engineering at University College London.

== Career ==
Farid's career has focused on researching and developing monoclonal antibodies to cell and gene therapies. She was appointed a lecturer at UCL in 2001 after completing her PhD there. In 2007 Farid's paper discussing the cost-effective manufacture of antibodies was published in the Journal of Chromatography .

She featured in Biotechnology and Bioengineering in 2012, with Farid evaluating current and future potential of batch and continuous cell culture technologies. The paper followed a case study into the commercial manufacture of monoclonal antibodies.

In 2020 Farid and lead-author Maria Papathanasiou published a paper in Nature on how T cells could be used as a cancer therapy in the future. Her expertise in the field led her to be part of the government task force during the COVID-19 pandemic as a member of the 100 Days Mission roundtable. Farid was also interviewed numerous times in relation to the development of a vaccine and also became Director of the UCL-AstraZeneca Bioprocessing Centre of Excellence.

In 2022 she was elected a fellow of the Royal Academy of Engineering. She is also co-director of the Future Targeted Healthcare Manufacturing Hub, which is funded by the Engineering and Physical Sciences Research Council.
