= Thornlea (disambiguation) =

Thornlea is a public high school in Thornhill, Ontario, Canada.

Thornlea may also refer to:

- Thornlea, Newfoundland and Labrador, Canada
- Thornlea, South Australia, Australia

== See also ==
- Thornley (disambiguation)
- Thornleigh, a suburb of Sydney, New South Wales, Australia
- Thornlie, a suburb of Perth, Western Australia
