= Anna Peacock =

Photonics researcher

Anna C. Peacock FREng FIEE is an electrical engineer specialising in photonics and fiber optics. Originally from New Zealand, she works in the UK as professor of photonics at the University of Southampton, where she heads the Nonlinear Semiconductor Photonics group of the Optoelectronics Research Centre.

== Education and career ==
Peacock moved to Cambridge, New Zealand as a child, and became a student at Cambridge High School. She was a physics undergraduate at the University of Auckland, where she studied quantum mechanics and nuclear physics, and became interested in photonics through the mentorship of John Dudley. After earning bachelor's and master's degrees in Auckland, in 1999 and 2001, she completed a Ph.D. in 2004 at the Optoelectronics Research Centre of the University of Southampton, under the supervision of Neil Broderick.

She was an RAEng Research Fellow at Southampton from 2007 to 2012, when she obtained an associate professorship there. She has been professor of photonics since 2015.

She is the editor-in-chief of the journal Optics Communications.

== Recognition ==
Peacock is an Optica Fellow, elected in 2017, "for outstanding contributions to nonlinear optics and the development of novel material optical fibers". She was elected as an IEEE Fellow, in the 2023 class of fellows, "for contributions to nonlinear fiber optics and materials". She is also a Fellow of the Institute of Physics. In 2024 she was elected a fellow of the Royal Academy of Engineering . In 2025 Peacock was awarded the CBBG lectureship by the Royal Society of Chemistry for her outstanding contributions to chemical biology and bioinorganic chemistry communities and her research on new-to-nature metalloproteins, including towards novel MRI contrast agents.
