= Faith Wainwright =

British structural engineer

- Born: 25 May 1962 (age 64)
- Education: University of Oxford
- Occupation: Structural engineer
- Employer: Arup
- Known for: President of the Institution of Structural Engineers 2018; Civil Engineer

Faith Helen Wainwright CBE (born 1962) is a British structural engineer, and a director of Arup Group. She has led in the structural design of multiple landmark buildings including the American Air Museum and the Tate Modern and holds an honorary doctorate from the University of Bath. Wainwright was the 2018 President of the Institution of Structural Engineers and is the Editor-in-chief of Ingenia (the educational magazine of the Royal Academy of Engineering).

== Education ==
Wainwright attended Queen Anne's School. She was one of the first female graduates of St Edmund Hall, Oxford, whence in 1983 she took a BA in Engineering.

== Career ==
Wainwright joined Arup after her graduation. At Arup she has contributed to The Shard, Hong Kong and Shanghai Bank Headquarters, Tate Modern, Velodrom (Berlin), Lycée Albert Camus (in Frejus, France) and has worked alongside architects such as Renzo Piano, Norman Foster, Baron Foster of Thames Bank, and Ken Shuttleworth.

Wainwright has been instrumental in transforming the structural engineering community, including influencing the "Confidential Reporting on Structural Safety" and has served as the first-ever woman on the Joint Board of Moderators (the professional body which regulates accreditation of university degree programmes in Civil engineering).

In 2014 Wainwright sat on the Research Excellence Framework sub-panel 14 (Civil and Construction Engineering) to assess the quality of University-based academic research in the UK.

Recognizing the importance of education and structural engineering, Wainwright established Arup University.

== Awards ==
In 2003, Wainwright was in the Arup team who won the International Information Industry Award recognizing their "innovation in knowledge management".

She was awarded Fellowship of the Royal Academy of Engineering in 2003, an MBE in 2012 for services to the built environment and engineering professions and an Honorary DEng from Bath University in 2014.

In 2015 Wainwright was elected an honorary fellow of St Edmund Hall.

She gave her inaugural address as President of the Institution of Structural Engineers on Thursday 11 January 2018.

== Personal life ==
Wainwright lives in Northwood, London.
