= St. George's British International School =

Educational institution in Rome, Italy

Coordinates: 41°53′53″N 12°26′42″E

St George's British International School
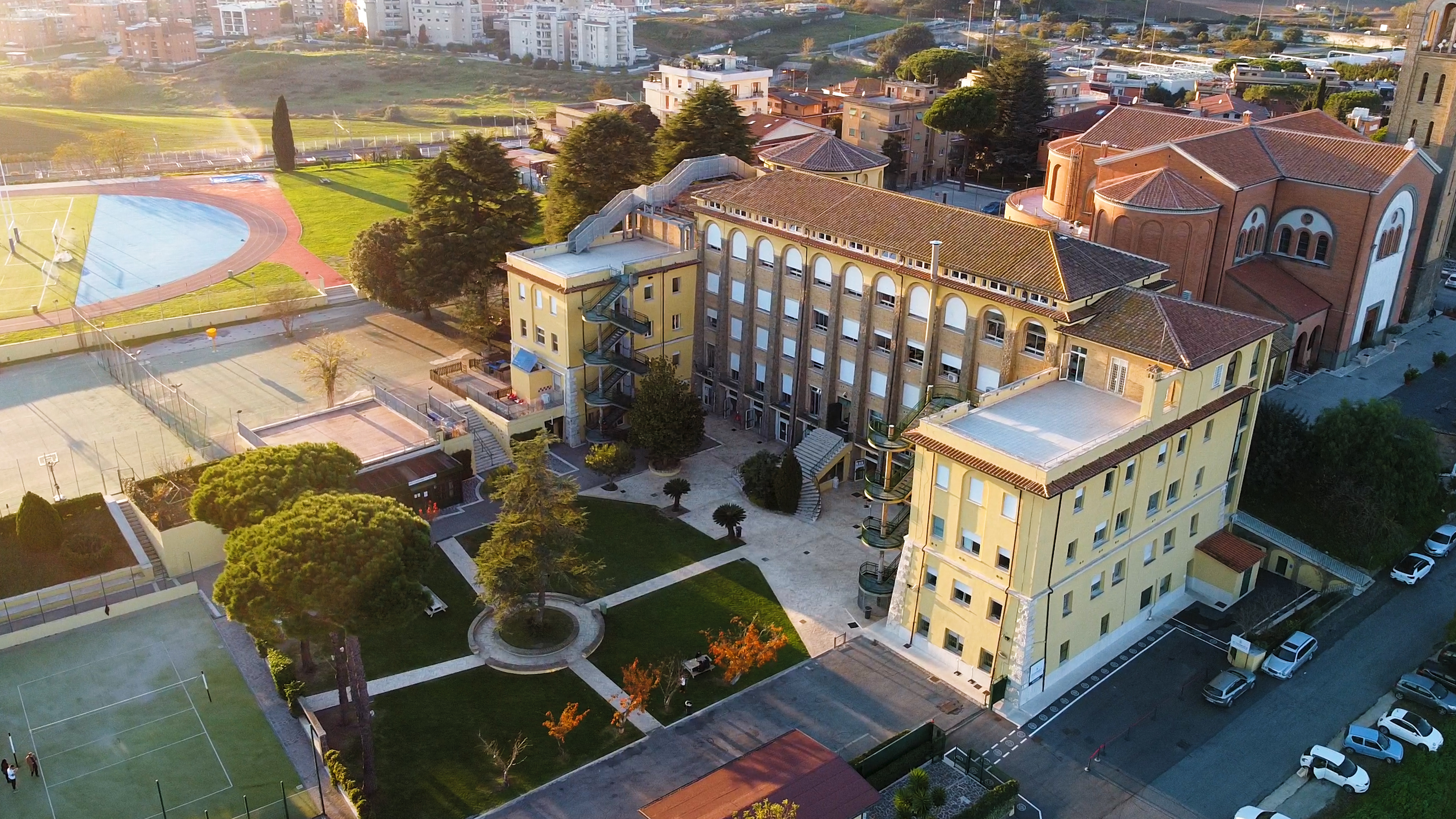

Location
- Via Cassia, km 16; Rome, Lazio, 00123; Italy

Information
- Type: International school
- Established: 1958
- Chair of the Board of Governors: Flaminia Muratori
- Principal: Alex Crossman
- Staff: 195
- Gender: Co-ed
- Age: 3 to 18
- Enrolment: 1034
- Houses: 4
- Colours: Red, White & Blue
- Website: http://www.stgeorge.school.it

St George's School S.R.L. unipersonale, operating as St George's British International School, is a non-profit private international school located in Rome, Italy. It was founded in 1958 to serve Rome's British, international, and expatriate communities, and today educates over 1,000 pupils from more than 100 countries. The main campus, containing Junior and Senior Schools, is located in La Storta on the northern outskirts of the city. A second campus in central Rome serves Junior School children up to the age of 11.

== History ==
St George’s British International School was founded in 1958, making it the oldest British international school in Italy. Originally named The English School, the school was founded as an independent, not-for-profit HMC school owned by an association made up of parents of the school. The school is a founding member of the Council of British International Schools.

The School became known as St George's English School and relocated to Via Salaria in 1961, before locating to its current premises in 1968. In 2002, the school opened a second campus, located in the central Nomentana neighbourhood of Rome. In 2017, the City Centre campus located to a new purpose-fitted campus close to the Vatican in the Aurelio neighbourhood.

As of 2019, the school's choir and orchestra held an annual music tour, which took place in Malta that year, at the Salesian Theatre in Sliema. As of 2024, it has 950 pupils, and a co-ed day boarding. Pupil age is 3 to 18. Head teacher was John Knight.

== Facilities and programmes ==
There are two campuses: La Storta and City Centre. The main campus, containing Junior and Senior Schools, is based in La Storta on the northern outskirts of the city. A second campus, located in central Rome, serves Junior School pupils up to the age of 11.

The school follows an enhanced version of the National Curriculum for England, culminating in IGCSE examinations at the end of Year 11. In the Sixth Form, students may choose to undertake the International Baccalaureate Diploma Programme or A-Levels with examinations sat at the end of Year 13.

The school's average IB Diploma score in 2025 was 36 points, one of the highest scoring IB schools in continental Europe.

== Co-curricular activities ==
The school has a number of boys and girls sports teams for various age groups which regularly compete against other teams and schools, including in rugby, football, and basketball. Other sports offered include athletics, cricket, gymnastics, field hockey, rounders, swimming, sailing, table tennis and volleyball.

Other after-school clubs include chess, coding, GTV, student newspaper, enterprise, cooking, arts, archaeology, film-making, computer programming and astronomy.

== Notable alumni ==
- Idris bin Abdullah al-Senussi - Prince, Senussiyya Royal Family, Libya
- Alessandro Borghese - Italian author and television personality
- Ilaria Capua - Italian virologist and former politician
- Eddie Cheever - American motor racer
- Romano Floriani Mussolini - Italian professional footballer
- Bianca Gascoigne - British model and television personality
- Alessandro Gassmann - Italian actor
- John Paul Getty III - American grandson of oil tycoon J. Paul Getty
- Andrea Guerra - Italian Executive Chairman, Eataly
- Karen King-Aribisala - Nigerian novelist
- Giovanna Melandri - Italian-American former politician, President of MAXXI
- Robin Monotti Graziadei - Italian architect, film producer, biourbanist, and water fountain designer
- Luca Paganini - Italian professional footballer
- Violante Placido - Italian singer and actress
- Taryn Power - American actress
- Tiziana Rossetto - Italian earth scientist
- Yvonne Sciò - Italian model and actress
- Marcantonio M. Spada - Italian-British academic psychologist, psychological therapy practitioner, and senior executive
- Etienne Tare - Albanian professional footballer
- Frans Timmermans - Dutch politician

== See also ==
- British people in Italy
- Protestant Cemetery in Rome
- The Schools Index
