= Patricia Thornley =

British civil engineer

Patricia Thornley is a British engineer who works as a professor at Aston University in Birmingham, where she directs the Energy and Bioproducts Research Institute and the Supergen Bioenergy Hub. Her research takes an interdisciplinary approach to the lifecycle evaluation of sustainable energy systems, including carbon dioxide emissions, renewable energy feedstocks, and low carbon alternative energy sources.

== Education and career ==
Thornley has a bachelor's degree in physics from the University of Durham, awarded in 1993. She completed a Ph.D. in 1996 at the University of Ulster with the dissertation The influence of feedstock properties on gasification plant performance.

Before taking her present position at Aston University in 2018, Thornley worked at the University of Manchester as a reader from 2003 to 2015 and as a professor from 2015 to 2018, holding the Chair of Sustainable Energy Systems. At Manchester, she founded and led the Supergen Bioenergy Hub from 2012 to 2017, relocating it with her to Aston University when she moved there.

She was editor-in-chief of the journal Biomass and Bioenergy for a six-year term beginning in 2018.

== Recognition ==
Thornley was elected as a Fellow of the Royal Academy of Engineering (FREng) in 2021.

In 2025, Thornley took over from Sarah Sharples as the Chief Scientific Adviser to the UK Department for Transport.
