= Optics Communications =

- Discipline: Optics
- Language: English
- Edited by: Anna Peacock

Publication details
- History: 1969–present
- Publisher: Elsevier
- Frequency: Biweekly
- Open access: Hybrid
- Impact factor: 2.5 (2024)

Standard abbreviations
- ISO 4: Opt. Commun.

Indexing
- CODEN: OPCOB8
- ISSN: 0030-4018
- LCCN: 77014636
- OCLC no.: 1761347

Links
- Journal homepage; Online archive

Optics Communications is a biweekly peer-reviewed scientific journal published by Elsevier. It covers all fields of optical science and technology and was established in 1969.

== Abstracting and indexing ==
The journal is abstracted and indexed in:

- Chemical Abstracts
- Current Contents/Engineering, Computing & Technology
- Current Contents/Physics, Chemical, & Earth Sciences
- Ei Compendex
- Inspec
- Science Citation Index Expanded
- Scopus

According to the Journal Citation Reports, the journal has a 2024 impact factor of 2.5.
