= Caroline Hazlewood =

Civil engineer

- Engineering career
- Awards: FREng

Caroline Hazlewood FREng is a Chartered Civil Engineer and Director of Water and Climate at HR Wallingford.

She is best known for her work in the field of flood risk modelling.

Hazlewood started their undergraduate in civil engineering at the University of Cape Town in 1996. They continued their studies to complete a MSc in hydraulic engineering in 2001. Hazlewood obtained their PhD in computational hydraulics in 2006 from the Open University.

Hazlewood joined HR Wallingford in 2002 when she was working on the development of methods for estimating roughness and water levels in rivers. This work underpins conveyance estimation systems developed for the Environment Agency.

Hazlewood became a Royal Academy of Engineering Fellow in 2023. She is also a member of the International Association for Hydro-Environment Engineering and Research.

Hazlewood is on the editorial board for the Journal of Flood Risk Management and is a member of the Industrial Advisory Board for the University of Bristol's Engineering Department.

== Selected works ==
- Knight, D.W., Hazlewood, C., Lamb, R., Samuels, P.G. and Shiono, K., 2018. Practical channel hydraulics: Roughness, conveyance and afflux. CRC Press.
