= Richard Dolby =

Richard Edwin Dolby, OBE, HonDMet, FREng, FIMMM, HonFWeldI (born 7 July 1938 in Sheffield) is a metallurgist and former Director of Research and Technology at The Welding Institute (TWI) in Cambridge, UK. He is a past President at the Institute of Materials, Minerals and Mining and a current Distinguished Research Fellow at the University of Cambridge Department of Materials Science and Metallurgy.

== Career ==
Richard Dolby's early career began at British Alcan and the General Electric Company, and in 1964 he joined The Welding Institute (British Welding Research Association). Here he worked on metallurgical aspects of HAZ toughness of pressure vessel steels and jointly led pioneering studies into lamellar tearing in welded structural steel. He spent 14 years specialising in metallurgy and carrying out fundamental industrial research in the Materials Department at the Institute, becoming Head of Department in 1978. He was appointed Director, Research and Technology in 1985 until his retirement in 2003 when The Welding Institute hosted a two-day conference in his honour.

The Welding Institute's Richard Dolby-Rolls-Royce Prize is given biennially to young engineers who demonstrate success in, and enthusiasm for, welding, joining and/or materials engineering at an early stage in their career.
