= Dina DʼAyala =

Dina Francesca D’Ayala FREng FICE
- Born: Italy
- Education: Sapienza University of Rome
- Scientific career
- Workplaces: University College London

Dina D’Ayala is an Italian civil engineer who is a professor of Structural Engineering at University College London and the UNESCO Chair in Disaster Risk Reduction and Resilience Engineering. She specialises in structural resilience, disaster risk reduction and the protection of existing buildings and infrastructure.

== Early ife and education ==
D'Ayala was born in Italy. She studied at the Sapienza University of Rome.

== Research and career ==
D’Ayala is Professor of Structural Engineering in UCL's Department of Civil, Environmental and Geomatic Engineering. She is co-director of the UCL EPICentre (Earthquake and People Interaction Centre) and co-director of StrEnTHE, the Structural and Environmental Laboratory at UCL Here East. Her research focuses on structural resilience engineering, including the assessment, strengthening and preservation of existing buildings, transport infrastructure and cultural heritage. She has studied how structures and infrastructure are made resilient to earthquakes and other geophysical hazards, as well as risks associated with climate change. She has participated in and led post-disaster reconnaissance missions examining the performance of buildings and infrastructure following major natural hazards. She has led research projects in countries including Nepal, Jordan, Turkey, Iraq and the Philippines.

In 2021, D’Ayala was appointed UNESCO Chair in Disaster Risk Reduction and Resilience Engineering. Through the UNESCO Chair, she works on international education and capacity building in disaster risk reduction and resilience engineering, including efforts to incorporate knowledge of infrastructure risk and resilience into higher education. D'Ayala is particularly interested in the resilience of school infrastructure. She worked with the World Bank Global Program for Safer Schools and developed the Global Library of School Infrastructure, a framework and repository intended to support seismic risk assessment and improvements to school infrastructure internationally.

D’Ayala has contributed to the development of the Global Library of School Infrastructure (GLoSI), an initiative that provides a framework for assessing the vulnerability and resilience of school buildings to natural hazards. Initially focused on seismic vulnerability, it provides a taxonomy for classifying school buildings according to structural characteristics that influence their performance during earthquakes.

D’Ayala has developed a Multi-Hazard School Taxonomy, extending the approach to include windstorms and flooding. The framework considers structural and non-structural characteristics affecting school resilience and enables buildings to be assessed consistently across multiple hazards. It has been piloted on schools in the Philippines as part of efforts to support risk-informed investment in safer and more resilient school infrastructure.

Following the 2015 Nepal earthquake, D’Ayala contributed to work on the assessment, strengthening and reconstruction of buildings and infrastructure, including guidance concerning the resilience of hospitals.

D'Ayala is a Fellow of the Institution of Civil Engineers and has served on professional and international engineering organisations concerned with earthquake engineering and disaster resilience. In 2026, D’Ayala was elected a Fellow of the Royal Academy of Engineering.

== Selected publications ==
- D'Ayala, D.; Speranza, E. (August 2003). "Definition of Collapse Mechanisms and Seismic Vulnerability of Historic Masonry Buildings". Earthquake Spectra. 19 (3): 479–509. Bibcode:2003EarSp..19..479D. doi:10.1193/1.1599896. ISSN 8755-2930.
- D’Ayala, Dina F.; Paganoni, Sara (2010-11-30). "Assessment and analysis of damage in L'Aquila historic city centre after 6th April 2009". Bulletin of Earthquake Engineering. 9 (1): 81–104. doi:10.1007/s10518-010-9224-4. ISSN 1570-761X.
- Sorrentino, Luigi; D'Ayala, Dina Francesca; Gianmarco de Felice; Michael C. Griffith; Sergio Lagomarsino; Guido Magenes (2016). "Review of Out-of-Plane Seismic Assessment Techniques Applied To Existing Masonry Buildings". International Journal of Architectural Heritage: 1–20. doi:10.1080/15583058.2016.1237586. Wikidata Q60634375.
