= Tiziana Rossetto =

British–Italian earth scientist

Tiziana Rossetto FREng
- Born: Adelaide
- Education: Imperial College London
- Scientific career
- Workplaces: University College London
- Thesis: Vulnerability curves for the seismic assessment of reinforced concrete building populations (2004)

Tiziana Rossetto is a British–Italian structural engineer who is Professor of Earthquake Engineering at University College London. She was elected a Fellow of the Royal Academy of Engineering in 2021.

== Early life and education ==
Rossetto was born in Adelaide. She attended St. George's British International School as a high school student, and moved to St Benedict's School in London as a sixth former. Rossetto was an undergraduate student at Imperial College London, where she studied civil engineering. She stayed at Imperial as a graduate student, and earned an MSc in earthquake engineering and structural dynamics in 1999. Rossetto remained in earthquake engineering as a doctoral researcher, where she worked on the topic of seismic assessment of reinforced concrete building populations. After graduating Rossetto worked as a structural engineer in London.

== Research and career ==
In 2004 Rossetto joined University College London. At University College London Rossetto founded the EPICentre research group, a collection of researchers evaluating the risk of tsunamis and earthquakes. Rossetto has participated in several field missions to evaluate the impact of earthquakes and tsunami on infrastructure. including the 2004 Indian Ocean Tsunami, Kashmir earthquake, Sichuan earthquake, L'Aquila earthquake and 2018 Sulawesi earthquake and tsunami. Rossetto is a specialist in the assessment of building vulnerability to earthquake and tsunami hazards. In 2014, Rossetto was awarded a European Research Council Starting Grant to investigate the vulnerability of structures to such natural hazards., where she collaborated with HR Wallingford to develop a new type of pneaumatic tsunami simulator. She was named the Stanford University Blume Earthquake Engineering Center Shah Lecturer in 2017.

== Selected publications ==
- Rossetto, T.; Elnashai, A. (2003). "Derivation of vulnerability functions for European-type RC structures based on observational data". Engineering Structures. 25 (10): 1241–1263. doi:10.1016/s0141-0296(03)00060-9. ISSN 0141-0296.
- Rossetto, Tiziana; Elnashai, Amr (2005). "A new analytical procedure for the derivation of displacement-based vulnerability curves for populations of RC structures". Engineering Structures. 27 (3): 397–409. doi:10.1016/j.engstruct.2004.11.002. ISSN 0141-0296.
- Zhao, Bin; Taucer, Fabio; Rossetto, Tiziana (2009). "Field investigation on the performance of building structures during the 12 May 2008 Wenchuan earthquake in China". Engineering Structures. 31 (8): 1707–1723. doi:10.1016/j.engstruct.2009.02.039. ISSN 0141-0296.
