= Catriona Savage =

British engineer and naval architect

Catriona Savage FREng
- Occupation: President of RINA
- Engineering career
- Discipline: Naval architecture
- Institutions: University College London
- Employer: Silverstream Technologies

Catriona Louise Savage (born February 1974) is a British engineer who is a professor at University College London. She specialises in the field of naval architecture and was the Royal Institution of Naval Architects first female President.

== Career ==
Savage began her career with BMT Defence Services as a naval architect following her graduation. She progressed through the ranks at BMT, becoming a chartered engineer and Head of Naval Architecture. Savage most recently served as BMT's Technical Director.

From 2017 Savage has worked at UCL as a professor and directs the university's MSc in naval architecture. Alongside this course, she also developed and directs the internationally renowned submarine design course.

In 2022 Savage became The Royal Institution of Naval Architects (RINA)'s first female President. The institution was founded back in 1860, and focuses on advancing naval architecture and marine technology through education, research, and professional development programmes. In 2023 she moved to the senior management team of Silverstream Technologies. In 2023 she was elected a Fellow of the Royal Academy of Engineering.
