= Gwen Parry-Jones =

British nuclear engineer

- Education: University of Manchester
- Engineering career
- Employer: Great British Nuclear
- Awards: OBE; FREng; Honorary Doctorate - Bangor University

Gwen Parry-Jones OBE FREng is a British engineer and the current CEO of Great British Nuclear. She has previously held a number of key managerial positions at energy companies, including Magnox Ltd and EDF Energy.

Parry-Jones has also held a number of industry & government roles in the UK, including a being a member of Civil Nuclear Police Authority Board between 2014 and 2018.

== Education ==
Parry-Jones holds a BSc in Physics and a Masters degree in Economics. She is a chartered physicist.

== Career ==
Parry-Jones began her career working for Magnox as a reactor physicist at Wylfa nuclear power station in 1989. She moved into management positions during the 1990s at EDF Energy and British Energy. These positions were located in both the UK and Canada. Throughout her career she has spent her working life delivering large engineering projects in the nuclear industry. This ranged from optimisation of reactor fleet through to providing decommissioning solutions.

Her work in the nuclear industry led her to receive an OBE for services to science and technology, after she became the first woman to hold the position of station director at a UK nuclear power station at Heysham.

She served as the CEO for Magnox Ltd from September 2019 until she became Great British Nuclear's first CEO in March 2023. In late 2023, she became a fellow at the Royal Academy of Engineering.

== Government roles ==
- Non-Executive Director and DSRL Board Member (2021 to 2023)
- Civil Nuclear Police Authority Board Industry member (2014 to 2018)
