= Niki Trigoni =

Greek computer scientist and academic

Agathoniki Trigoni
- Education: University of Cambridge; Athens University of Economics and Business
- Scientific career
- Workplaces: University of Oxford; Birkbeck, University of London; Cornell University
- Thesis: Semantic optimization of OQL queries (2002)

Agathoniki Trigoni is a Greek computer scientist who is a professor in the University of Oxford Department of Computer Science and a Fellow of Kellogg College. Trigoni is the Chief Technology Officer of Navenio, a company she founded to provide scalable and accurate indoor location systems. She was elected a Fellow of the Royal Academy of Engineering in 2022.

== Early life and education ==
Trigoni was born in Chalcis and grew up in Greece. As a teenager, she considered becoming a pianist and mathematician, but eventually settled on computer science. She studied toward her bachelor's degree in at the Athens University of Economics and Business. Her first job was at the National Bank of Greece, where she assessed credit risk and issued loans to companies. Trigoni was a doctoral researcher at the University of Cambridge. Her doctoral research considered query optimisation for object-oriented operating systems. She moved to Cornell University for postdoctoral training.

== Research and career ==
In 2004, Trigoni joined Birkbeck, University of London as a lecturer. She moved to the University of Oxford in 2007, where she developed the Cyber Physical Systems Group and was made a Fellow of Kellogg College. She was also appointed Director of the Engineering and Physical Sciences Research Council Centre for Doctoral Training on Autonomous Intelligent Machines and Systems.

Trigoni's research considers the development of intelligent and autonomous sensor systems for healthcare, positioning and environmental monitoring. In particular, she has developed novel location systems that can operate indoors. Location systems often struggle to penetrate infrastructure, which compromises the use of high frequency electromagnetic waves. Trigoni looks to combine multiple pervasive technologies to improve the reliability of positioning information. These technologies include visual odometer, inertial tracking and magneto-inductive positioning.

In 2015, Trigoni founded Navenio, a company which provides scalable, robust and accurate indoor location systems. She is the chief technology officer. During the COVID-19 pandemic, Navenio was used by National Health Service trusts for workflow optimisation.

== Awards and honours ==
- 2022 Fellow of the Royal Academy of Engineering
- 2022 Women in IT Awards CTO of the Year

== Selected publications ==
- Qingyong Hu; Bo Yang; Linhai Xie; Stefano Rosa; Yulan Guo; Zhihua Wang; Niki Trigoni; Andrew Markham (June 2020), RandLA-Net: Efficient Semantic Segmentation of Large-Scale Point Clouds, Institute of Electrical and Electronics Engineers, doi:10.1109/cvpr42600.2020.01112, Wikidata Q114191856
- Sen Wang; Ronald Clark; Hongkai Wen; Niki Trigoni (May 2017), DeepVO: Towards end-to-end visual odometry with deep Recurrent Convolutional Neural Networks, Institute of Electrical and Electronics Engineers, arXiv:1709.08429, doi:10.1109/icra.2017.7989236, Wikidata Q114192837
- Sonia Waharte; Niki Trigoni (September 2010), Supporting Search and Rescue Operations with UAVs, Institute of Electrical and Electronics Engineers, doi:10.1109/est.2010.31, Wikidata Q114192832
