= Aldo R. Boccaccini =

Italian materials scientist

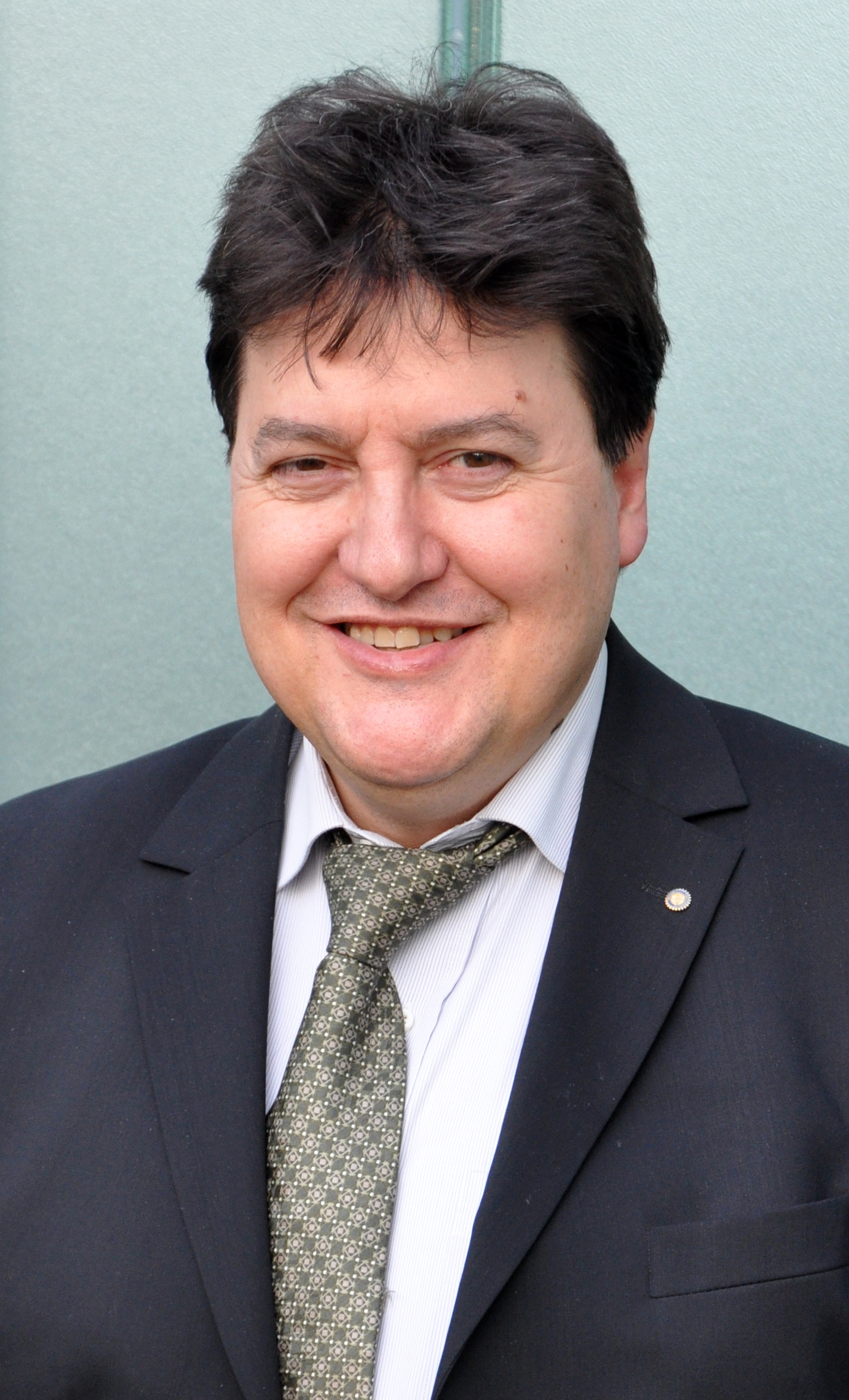
Aldo R. Boccaccini in March 2015

Aldo Roberto Boccaccini (born 2 September 1962 in San Rafael, Argentina) is a material scientist. He is currently a Professor of Biomaterials and Head of the Institute of Biomaterials at the Department of Materials Science and Engineering, University of Erlangen-Nuremberg, Erlangen, Germany. He is also visiting professor at Imperial College London (UK).

== Biography ==
Boccaccini studied 2 years of electromechanical engineering at Universidad Tecnologica Nacional, in San Rafael, Argentina, and earned his engineering degree in Nuclear Engineering at Instituto Balseiro, S. C. de Bariloche, Argentina in 1987. He then moved to Germany and carried out his doctoral studies at RWTH Aachen, where he earned his doctoral degree (Dr.-Ing) in 1994. He then held postdoctoral positions in the UK at University of Birmingham, School of Metallurgy and Materials and in the USA, University of California, San Diego. In 2001 Boccaccini received his habilitation at Technical University Ilmenau, Germany. In 2000 Boccaccini joined the Department of Materials at Imperial College London (UK), where he was appointed Professor of Materials Science and Engineering in 2008. In 2009 Boccaccini moved to Germany as Professor for Biomaterials and Head of the Institute of Bomaterials at University of Erlangen-Nuremberg. He was appointed chair of the Department of Materials Science and Engineering from 2017 to 2019. In 2022 Boccaccini was named "Outstanding Personality" of his hometown San Rafael, Mendoza, Argentina.

== Academic work ==
The fields of research of Boccaccini in the broad field of materials science and engineering focus on biomaterials for a variety of biomedical applications. In particular his research focuses on bioactive glasses and composites, bioactive coatings, tissue engineering scaffolds and drug delivery systems. He is also a pioneer of the field of electrophoretic deposition applied to biomedical and functional materials. Boccaccini is also member of the Advisory Board of the Network of Argentine Scientists in Germany and an international advisor to the Ministry of Science, Technology and Innovative Production of Argentina since 2008. Boccaccini was an elected member of the council of the European Society for Biomaterials (ESB) in the period 2016-2023, and served as vice-president of ESB in the period 2020-2023. He was also the vice-president of the Federation of European Materials Society (FEMS) (2022-2023). He was elected president of FEMS for the period 2024-2026. Since 2018, Boccaccini has also been a full member of the German Academy of Science and Engineering, acatech. In 2022, Boccaccini was conferred an Honorary Doctorate by Åbo Akademi University, in Turku, Finland, and in 2023 he was elected Fellow of Biomaterials Science and Engineering (FBSE) by the International Union of Societies for Biomaterials Science and Engineering (IUSBSE). In 2025, Boccaccini received honorary doctorates from Riga Technical University (Latvia), Alexander Dubček University of Trenčín (Slovakia) and International University of Catalonia, Barcelona (Spain). He was the recipient of the George Winter Award of the European Society for Biomaterials (2024) and the Larry Hench Lifetime Achievement Award of the American Ceramic Society (2025).

== Publications ==
Prof. Boccaccini was the editor-in-chief of the journal Materials Letters for 14 years (2010-2023) and the founding editor-in-chief of the Open Access journal Biomedical Glasses (launched in 2014, discontinued in 2021). He is currently editor of the journal Progress in Materials Science. Boccaccini has published more than 900 research papers, he has co-edited 8 books and more than 20 book chapters. Boccaccini is a highly cited researcher, according to the Highly Cited 2014 list published by Thomson Reuters. He has been cited more than 115,000 and has an h-index of 154 as listed in Google Scholar. In 2018, Boccaccini was again included in Clarivate Analytics' list of the most cited scientists and, since 2023, he is listed as one of the highly cited researchers in the world according to the Stanford List of Highly Cited Researchers published in October 2023.
