= Patricia Foster =

British electrical engineer

Patricia Ruth Foster is a British Electrical engineer. She was named a fellow of the Royal Academy of Engineering, and Institution of Electrical Engineers.

== Life ==
She graduated from the University of Edinburgh, and the Ph.D. degree from the University of Cambridge, in physics.,

From 1973 to 1979, she was an Engineer with ERA Technology. From 1979 to 1984, she was a manager, New Antenna Systems. In 1984, she founded Microwave and Antenna Systems (MAAS),

== Works ==
- Taylor, James D. (1994-12-16). "Antennas and UWB Systems". Introduction to Ultra-Wideband Radar Systems. CRC Press. ISBN 978-0-8493-4440-4.
- Foster, Patricia R. (1992-05-01). Lahaie, Ivan J. (ed.). "Performance of ultrawideband antennas". Ultrawideband Radar. 1631. SPIE: 134–145. Bibcode:1992SPIE.1631..134F. doi:10.1117/12.59035. S2CID 109520356.
- Foster Patricia R. Radio observations in the short microwave region . Quart . J. Roy . Astron . Soc, 1969, 10, No 3, 206—222
- Foster, P.R.; Wylde, R.J. (June 1992). "The effect of quasi-optics errors on reflector antenna performance". IEEE Transactions on Microwave Theory and Techniques. 40 (6): 1318–1322. Bibcode:1992ITMTT..40.1318F. doi:10.1109/22.141366. ISSN 1557-9670.
