= Alison Vincent =

Information technologist

Alison Vincent is a British engineer who is the Chief Technology Officer for Cisco in the UK and Ireland. In 2020 she was elected a Fellow of the Royal Academy of Engineering.

== Early life and education ==
She holds a PhD in Mathematics and Cryptography and a BSc in Mathematics and Computer Science from Royal Holloway, University of London.

== Career ==
Vincent worked for NDS before it was acquired by Cisco in 2012 and has worked for Cisco since then. Previously, she worked at IBM and at Micro Focus. She specializes in introducing agile methodologies to organizations.

In 2022, Vincent was named chair of strategic board for the Digital Twin Hub, a hub for learning, developing ideas and driving innovation in global systemic challenges currently facing the world.
