= Yoshio Masui =

Japanese-Canadian cell biologist (1931–2024)

- Born: 増井 禎夫; January 1, 1931; Kyoto, Japan
- Died: April 18, 2024 (aged 93)
- Education: Kyoto University
- Known for: Pioneering work on cell division
- Awards: Lasker award (1998); FRS (1998)
- Scientific career
- Workplaces: University of Toronto; Yale University

Yoshio Masui (増井 禎夫, Masui Yoshio; January 1, 1931 – April 18, 2024) was a Japanese-Canadian cell biologist. Masui retired in 1997 and held the position of Professor Emeritus at the University of Toronto.

== Life and career ==
Masui studied biology at Kyoto University, graduating with his Bachelor of Science degree in zoology in 1953, his Master of Science in 1955 and his Ph.D. in 1961.

While still studying at Kyoto University, he taught biology, first as a teacher's assistant and then as a teacher, at Konan University, where he was promoted to assistant professor after his earning his Ph.D. In 1966, he moved to Yale University to join Clement L. Markert's lab, and in 1969 to the University of Toronto, where he taught as associate professor in the Department of Zoology.

Masui died on April 18, 2024, at the age of 93.

== Recognition ==
In 1998, Masui won the Albert Lasker Award for Basic Medical Research with Lee Hartwell and Paul Nurse for their pioneering work on cell division. He was elected a Fellow of the Royal Society (FRS) in 1998 and an officer of the Order of Canada in 2003 in recognition of his life's work. In 1992 he was awarded the Gairdner Foundation International Award.
