= Alexander F. Vakakis =

Alexander F. Vakakis is an American mechanical engineer focusing on controls and dynamics, and currently the Grayce Wicall Gauthier Professor at the University of Illinois.

His doctoral students at the University of Illinois have included Hanna Cho.
