= Jane Atkinson =

Chemical engineer

Jane Victoria Atkinson is a British chemical engineer who is Executive Director of Engineering and Automation at Bilfinger UK.

== Education ==
Atkinson studied chemical engineering at Loughborough University, and in 2011 she received an honorary doctorate in business administration from Teesside University.

== Career ==
Her career began as a sponsored engineering student with British Steel in 1990. On completion of her first degree she worked as a technical advisor at the Teesside blast furnace before moving into operations, becoming the first woman in the world to manage a blast furnace in 2004 – the Corus cast house at Redcar. She was later the second woman in the world to manage a coke oven.

During her time in the steel industry she managed many major production units and spent five years with the company in Alabama in the USA.

She later became Senior Vice President Utilities Operations at SembCorp Utilities UK. Moving to Cape plc in 2014 she was eventually responsible for its merger with Hertel and NSG to create Altrad. She moved to Bilfinger in 2019.

== Honours ==
The CBI honoured her as Britain’s top female engineer in 2007 and in 2010 she became the youngest woman Fellow of the Royal Academy of Engineering. In 2019 she was recognised as the first of the 100 top women leaders in engineering in the UK. She is also a Fellow of IChemE and has chartered and designated European Engineer status.
