= Institute of Materials, Minerals and Mining =

British engineering institution

Institute of Materials, Minerals and Mining (IOM3)
- Abbreviation: IOM3
- Formation: 2002
- Legal status: Non-profit organization
- Purpose: promote the science, design, engineering and technology of materials, minerals and mining and their practical applications and facilitate qualifications, professional recognition and development
- Location: 297 Euston Road, London, NW1 3AD
- Region served: Worldwide but predominantly UK and Europe
- Members: Academics and industrialists across the Materials, Minerals and Mining sectors
- President: Christine Blackmore
- Main organ: IOM3 Council
- Website: iom3.org

The Institute of Materials, Minerals and Mining (IOM3) is a British engineering institution with activities including promotion of the development of materials science.

It has been a registered charity governed by a royal charter and a member of the United Kingdom's Science Council, since 2002. In 2019, the IOM3 celebrated the 150-year anniversary of the establishment of the Iron and Steel Institute which the IOM3 now encompasses. In 2022, it had a gross income of £3.99 million.

== Structure ==
Having resided at Carlton House Terrace off Pall Mall in St James's in central London since 2002, the institute moved to 297 Euston Road on 30 June 2015. The organization has its membership, education, sales, and knowledge transfer office in Grantham.

Members qualify for different grades of membership, ranging from Affiliate to Fellow of the Institute of Materials, Minerals and Mining (FIMMM), depending on academic qualifications and professional experience. IOM3 has an individual membership of 15,000, and represents a combination of scientific, technical and human resources.

=== Affiliated Local Societies ===
Approximately 25 UK 'local societies' are affiliated with the institute, covering a wide range of disciplines such as ceramics, composites, mining, packaging, polymers, and metallurgy, and organizing events throughout the year.

=== Technical Communities ===
Since April 2022 IOM3 has 22 Technical Community groups representing the breadth of disciplines covered and the materials cycle. These groups previously known as Divisions are now termed as the "IOM3 XXXXX Group" with a common identity and branding/logo.

== History ==
The institute's roots go back to the Iron and Steel Institute. In 1869, ironmaster William Menelaus convened and chaired a meeting at the Midland Railway's Queen's Hotel in Birmingham, West Midlands, which led to the founding of the Iron and Steel Institute, which received its royal charters in 1899. Menelaus was its president from 1875 to 1877, and in 1881 was awarded the Bessemer Gold Medal.

In 1974, the Iron and Steel Institute merged into the Institute of Metals. The Institute of Metals then merged in 1993, with The Institute of Ceramics and The Plastics and Rubber Institute (PRI) to form the Institute of Materials (IoM). The PRI was itself a merger of The Plastics Institute and the Institution of the Rubber Industry (known as the IRI) during the 1980s, a reflection of the declining UK rubber manufacturing industry during this period.

IOM3 was formed from the merger of the Institute of Materials and the Institution of Mining and Metallurgy (IMM) in June 2002.

More recent mergers include the Institute of Packaging (2005), the Institute of Clay Technology (2006) the Institute of Wood Science (2009) and the Institute of Vitreous Enamellers (2010).

=== List of presidents ===
- 2025–26: Christine Blackmore
- 2023–24: Kate Thornton
- 2021–22: Neil Glover
- 2019–20: Serena Best
- 2017–18: Martin Cox
- 2015–16: Mike Hicks
- 2013–14: Jon Binner
- 2011–12: Jan Lewis
- 2008–10: Barry Lye
- 2006–07: Richard Dolby OBE
- 2004–05: A Jeff Smith
- 2002–03: Colin Humphreys CBE FRS

== Function ==
The institute ensures that courses in materials, minerals, mining technology and engineering conform to the standards for professional registration with the Engineering Council UK which establishes codes of practice and monitors legislative matters affecting members' professional interests.

The professional development program run by the institute contributes to members' careers towards senior grades of membership and Chartered Scientist (CSci) and Chartered Engineer (CEng) status.

Members receive reduced rates for the institute's many books, journals and conferences and from access to the institute's Information Services. These include extensive library resources as well as a team of materials experts who provide consultancy services to Institute members, and to companies who have joined the institute's Business Partner Program.

=== Fellows ===
Fellow of the Institute of Materials, Minerals and Mining (FIMMM) is an award granted to individuals that the IOM3 judges to have made "significant contribution or established a record of achievement in the materials, minerals, mining". Applications for fellowships are open to both members and non-members of the IOM3. Applications must be supported by two letters of recommendation from current fellows of the IOM3 and have known the applicant for a minimum of 2 years. Examples of fellows include Harshad Bhadeshia, Rachel Thomson, Derek Fray, Robert Baker, Jason WA Robinson, Serena Best, Ruth Cameron, Graham Cooley and Allan Matthews. Honorary fellows include Mark Miodownik and Sue Ion. Fellows are entitled to use the post-nominal letters FIMMM.

== Activities ==
The institute's educational activities aim to promote the materials discipline to younger generations by allowing access, through the Schools Affiliate Scheme, to a range of educational resources and materials. The institute has close links with schools and colleges and is responsible for accrediting university and college courses and industrial training schemes. The Education & Outreach Trust, which incorporated the institute's existing education activities and was granted charitable status in 2022, offers teachers courses and teaching resources on materials, as well as careers advice for students. Institute publications such as definitive textbooks are available to students at reduced prices. The institute also offers a series of grants and bursaries to encourage students and organizes events such as the Young Persons' Lecture Competition.

=== Publications ===
The trading subsidiary of the institute, IOM Communications Ltd, is responsible for producing any related journals. To expand, these include the members' journals (magazines) Materials World magazine and Clay Technology. Sage Publishing produces a range of learned journals for the institute, including the Ironmaking and Steelmaking journal, Surface Engineering, Powder Metallurgy, Corrosion Engineering, International Materials Reviews and Materials Science and Technology. The institute also publishes ICON, incorporating IMMAGE (Information on Mining, Metallurgy and Geological Exploration), a reference database of abstracts and citations of scientific and engineering literature for the international minerals industry, and it has links to OneMine, a database of mining publications.

==== Materials World ====
Materials World is the member's magazine of the institute, specifically devoted to the engineering materials cycle, from mining and extraction, through processing and application, to recycling and recovery. Editorially, it embraces the whole spectrum of materials and minerals – metals, plastics, polymers, rubber, composites, ceramics and glasses – with particular emphasis on advanced technologies, latest developments and new applications, giving prominence to the topics that are of fundamental importance to those in the industry.

=== Advice ===
The Materials Information Service is a service of the institute which has been giving advice to industry on the selection and use of materials since 1988. This is now part of the institute's Information Services which includes technical inquiry and library services for the materials, minerals and mining sectors, an information help desk, regionally based advisors, and related services. Companies can gain access to the institute's information resources by joining its Business Partner Program Scheme.

=== Conferences ===
The institute's Conference Department organizes conferences, events, and exhibitions with the institute's technical committees to help keep members and other delegates informed of the latest developments within the materials, minerals, and mining arena.

=== Awards ===
The IOM3 grants several awards including:

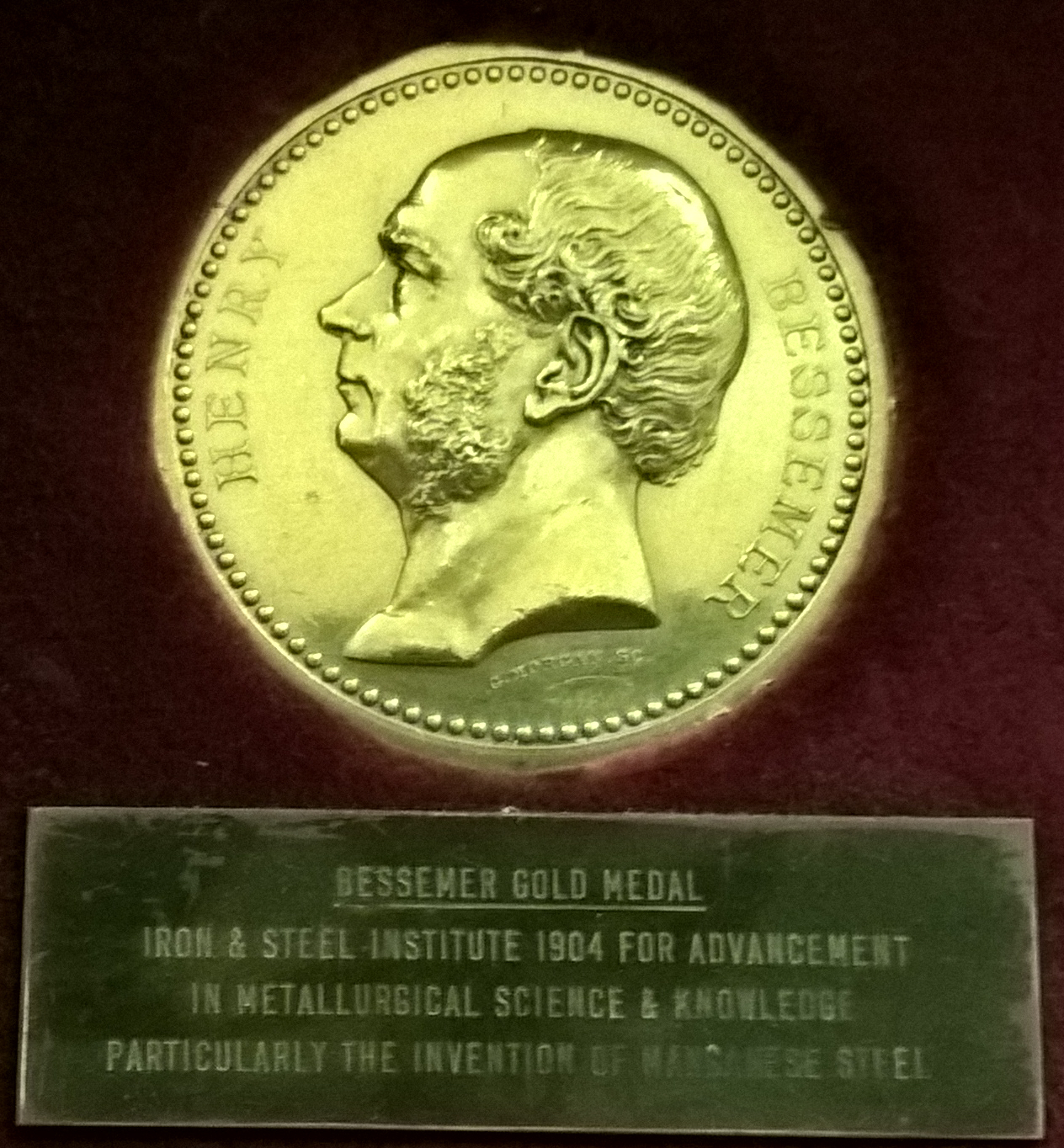
- Bessemer medal awarded in 1904 to Robert Hadfield
  The Bessemer Gold Medal is an annual prize awarded by the institute for "outstanding services to the steel industry". It was established and endowed by Sir Henry Bessemer in 1874. It was first awarded to Isaac Lowthian Bell in 1874. The 2016 award was to Alan Cramb.
- The Silver Medal is awarded annually to a young scientist (under the age of 35) designated as "outstanding" in recognition of a crucial contribution to a field of interest. In addition, the institute has many other significant awards for Personal Achievement and Published Works covering materials, minerals and mining. In particular, there are awards covering surface engineering, biomedical materials, ceramics, rubber and plastics, iron and steel, and automotive areas. There are also awards covering education and local societies.

=== Youth ===
On 10 November 2016, the institute launched an Engineering Extravaganza event to encourage people aged 12 to 14 to consider careers in engineering as part of "Tomorrow's Engineers Week". tomorrowsengineers.org.uk..

== See also ==
- List of mechanical engineering awards
