= Jennifer Wen =

Professor of engineering

Jennifer X. Wen is professor in energy resilience at the University of Surrey, England. She was previously professor of engineering at the University of Warwick, England, where she led "Warwick FIRE", a "multidisciplinary research laboratory for both fundamental and applied research in fire, explosions and other safety related reactive and non-reactive flows".

She is vice-chair of the International Association for Fire Safety Science.

== Education ==
Wen has a B.Eng. (1984) from Shanghai Jiao Tong University; a Ph.D. (1990) in heat transfer from Queen Mary and Westfield College, University of London; a Certificate in Management Studies (1993) from Oxford Brookes University; and a Postgraduate Certificate in Higher Education (1994) from London South Bank University.

She is a Fellow of the Institution of Mechanical Engineers and in 2024 she was elected a fellow of the Royal Academy of Engineering
