= Journal of Micromechanics and Microengineering =

- Discipline: Micromechanics and Microengineering
- Language: English
- Edited by: Weileun Fang

Publication details
- History: 1991–present
- Publisher: IOP Publishing (United Kingdom)
- Frequency: Monthly
- Open access: Hybrid
- Impact factor: 2.4 (2023)

Standard abbreviations
- ISO 4: J. Micromech. Microeng.

Indexing
- ISSN: 0960-1317 (print); 1361-6439 (web)

Links
- Journal homepage

The Journal of Micromechanics and Microengineering is a peer-reviewed scientific journal that covers all aspects of microelectromechanical systems, devices and structures, as well as micromechanics, microengineering, and microfabrication. The editor-in-chief is Weileun Fang (National Tsing Hua University).

== Abstracting and indexing ==
The journal has a 2023 impact factor of 2.4 according to the Journal Citation Reports. It is indexed in Inspec, PASCAL, Current Contents/Engineering Computing and Technology, Science Citation Index, Chemical Abstracts, Mass Spectrometry Bulletin, Engineering Index/Compendex, Applied Mechanics Reviews, and VINITI Database RAS.
