= Alicia El Haj =

Professor of Cell Engineering

- Education: Manchester University; University of Aberdeen
- Known for: Tissue engineering Regenerative medicine
- Scientific career
- Workplaces: Keele University; University of Birmingham

Alicia El Haj is a Professor and the Interdisciplinary Chair of Cell Engineering at the School of Chemical Engineering and the Healthcare Technologies Institute at the Institute of Translational Medicine, University of Birmingham. She is the President of the UK Bioengineering Society and Director of MICA Biosystems. She is a Fellow of the Royal Academy of Engineering. She was president of the European Council of the International Society for Tissue Engineering and Regenerative Medicine (2010 to 2014).

== Early life and education ==
El Haj earned a Masters at University of Manchester and a PhD at the University of Aberdeen.

== Research and career ==
El Haj is a leading researcher in regenerative medicine. In 1989 El Haj joined the University of Birmingham as a lecturer. She was a member of the Birmingham Rowing Club, and won Oarswoman of the Year in 1992. In 1997 she was appointed to Keele University, to lead a joint programme in cell engineering with the University of Manchester. At Keele University she set up the Institute for Science and Technology in Medicine. She rejoined the University of Birmingham in 2018 as Interdisciplinary Chair in Cell Engineering within the Healthcare Technologies Institute.

In 2004 El Haj was made Director of the Institute for Science and Technology in Medicine. The Institute treated osteoarthritis sufferers by taking cartilage cells from the healthy parts of patient's knees and culturing them in vitro to grow new knee tissue. At Keele University, she has been the Theme Lead for Bioengineering and Regenerative Medicine. She was awarded a Royal Society research fellowship in 2013 which allowed her to expand stem cell therapy for orthopaedic applications. That year she won the Royal Society Wolfson Research Merit Award.

EL Haj's team are designing therapeutics where magnetic nanoparticles are used to signal systems on a cell, injecting them into the body and using an external magnet to guide them to where they are needed. She is investigating the best conditions for growing the matrix of bone. In 2015 she won the Medical Research Council Suffrage Science Award. In 2016 she became co-director of the Engineering and Physical Sciences Research Council Centre for Innovative Manufacturing Centre in Regenerative Medicine. She is Chair Elect of the European Council's Tissue Engineering and Regenerative Medicine International Society. El Haj was made a Fellow of the Royal Academy of Engineering in 2017.

El Haj is the Chair of the Bioengineering Society.

== Selected publications ==
- El Haj, Alicia; Ahearne, Mark; Yang, Ying; Y Then, Kong; Liu, Kuo-Kang (28 July 2005). "Characterizing the viscoelastic properties of thin hydrogel-based constructs for tissue engineering applications". Journal of the Royal Society Interface. 2 (5): 455–463. doi:10.1098/rsif.2005.0065. PMC 1618501. PMID 16849205.
- El-Haj, Alicia; Rawlinson, Simon; Minter, Sarah; Tavares, Ignatius; Bennett, Alan; Lanyon, Lance (December 1991). "Loading‐related increases in prostaglandin production in cores of adult canine cancellous bone in vitro: A role for prostacyclin in adaptive bone remodeling?". Journal of Bone and Mineral Research. 6 (12): 1345–1351. doi:10.1002/jbmr.5650061212. PMID 1724342. S2CID 24997265.
