= Serena Best =

British academic

Serena Michelle Best CBE FREng CEng FIMMM, is a British academic, and the Professor of Materials Science at the University of Cambridge.

Best has a BSc from the University of Surrey, and a PhD from the University of London. She was elected Fellow of the Royal Academy of Engineering (FREng) in 2012.

In the 2017 Birthday Honours, Best was made a CBE, "For services to Biomaterials Engineering."

Best was President of the Institute of Materials, Minerals and Mining from 2019 to 2020.

== Selected publications ==
- Araujo JV, Davidenko N, Danner M, Cameron RE, Best SM: Novel Porous scaffolds of pH Responsive Chitosan/Carrageenan-based Polyelectrolyte Complexes for Tissue Engineering. J Biomed Mater Res A. 2014 Feb 14.
- Pawelec KM, Husmann A, Best SM, Cameron RE: Understanding anisotropy and architecture in ice-templated biopolymer scaffolds. Mater Sci Eng C Mater Biol Appl. 2014 Apr 1;37:141-7.
- Pawelec KM, Husmann A, Best SM, Cameron RE: A design protocol for tailoring ice-templated scaffold structure. J R Soc Interface. 2014 Jan 8;11(92):20130958.
- Shepherd JH, Ghose S, Kew SJ, Moavenian A, Best SM, Cameron RE: Effect of fiber crosslinking on collagen-fiber reinforced collagen-chondroitin-6-sulfate materials for regenerating load-bearing soft tissues. J Biomed Mater Res A. 2013 Jan;101(1):176-84.
- Kew SJ, Gwynne JH, Enea D, Brookes R, Rushton N, Best SM, Cameron RE: Synthetic collagen fascicles for the regeneration of tendon tissue. Acta Biomater. 2012 Oct;8(10):3723-31.
- Grover CN, Gwynne JH, Pugh N, Hamaia S, Farndale RW, Best SM, Cameron RE: Crosslinking and composition influence the surface properties, mechanical stiffness and cell reactivity of collagen-based films. Acta Biomater. 2012 Aug;8(8):3080-90.
- Grover CN, Farndale RW, Best SM, Cameron RE: The interplay between physical and chemical properties of protein films affects their bioactivity. J Biomed Mater Res A. 2012 Sep;100(9):2401-11.
- Grover CN, Cameron RE, Best SM: Investigating the morphological, mechanical and degradation properties of scaffolds comprising collagen, gelatin and elastin for use in soft tissue engineering. J Mech Behav Biomed Mater. 2012 Jun;10:62-74.
