= Claire Davis =

British metallurgist and academic

Claire Louise Davis
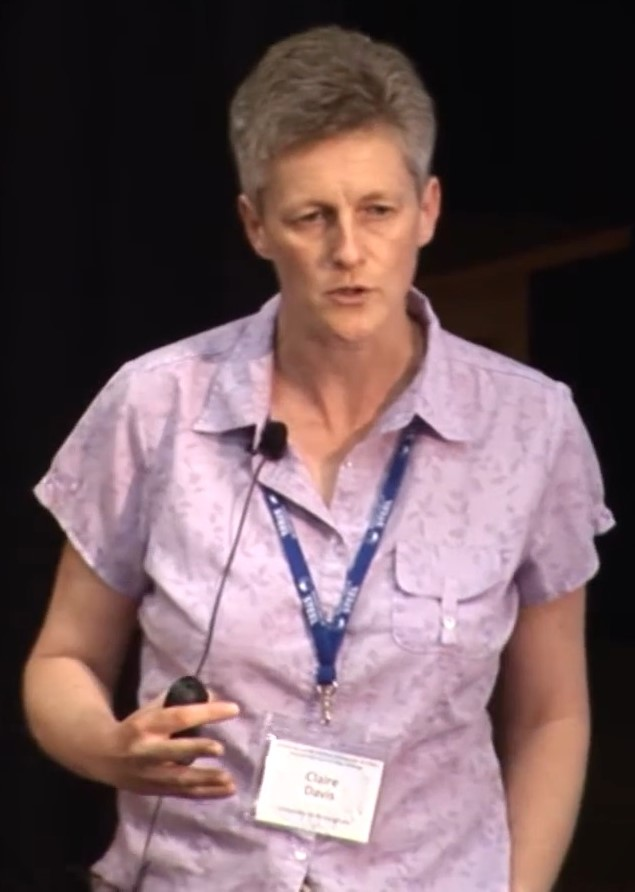
- Davis lectures in 2013
- Education: University of Cambridge
- Scientific career
- Workplaces: University of Warwick; University of Birmingham
- Thesis: Cleavage initiation in the intercritically reheated coarse grained heat affected zone of steels (1994)

Claire Louise Davis is a British metallurgist who is Tata Steel Professor and chair in Low Energy Steel Processing at the University of Warwick. She was elected a Fellow of the Royal Academy of Engineering in 2024.

== Early life and education ==
Davis was an undergraduate and postgraduate student at the University of Cambridge. She was supported by Tata Steel for her studies, and spent part of her doctoral research at Nippon Steel. Her doctoral research looked at the structural properties of steel.

== Research and career ==
At Warwick, Davis develops research to improve the performance of steel, develop new steels and create new strategies to process steels. Her research considers the composition-processing-structure relationships in steels. She has developed rapid alloy processing and in-line sensors to evaluate steel microstructures. Davis has developed various strategies to create green steels. This involves the use of non-metallic coatings and surface state optimisation.

Alongside her research, Davis has focussed on the development of innovations in materials science education.

== Awards and honours ==
- 2006 British Science Association Isambard Kingdom Brunel Award Lecture
- 2019 Institute of Materials, Minerals and Mining Sir Robert Hadfield Medal
- Fellow of the Institute of Materials, Minerals and Mining
- Fellow of the Institute of Learning and Teaching
- Fellow of the Royal Academy of Engineering

== Selected publications ==
- M Ph Papaelias; C Roberts; C L Davis (1 July 2008). "A review on non-destructive evaluation of rails: State-of-the-art and future development". Proceedings of the Institution of Mechanical Engineers. 222 (4): 367–384. doi:10.1243/09544097jrrt209. ISSN 0954-4097. Wikidata Q107615578.
- C. L. Davis; J. E. King (March 1994). "Cleavage initiation in the intercritically reheated coarse-grained heat-affected zone: Part I. Fractographic evidence". Metallurgical and Materials Transactions A - Physical Metallurgy and Materials Science. 25 (3): 563–573. doi:10.1007/bf02651598. ISSN 1073-5623. Wikidata Q56430817.
- M.Ph. Papaelias; M.C. Lugg; C. Roberts; C.L. Davis (June 2009). "High-speed inspection of rails using ACFM techniques". NDT and E International. 42 (4): 328–335. doi:10.1016/j.ndteint.2008.12.008. ISSN 0963-8695. Wikidata Q107615576.
