= WeiLeun Fang =

Taiwanese engineer

WeiLeun Fang from the National Tsing Hua University, Hsinchu, Taiwan, was named Fellow of the Institute of Electrical and Electronics Engineers (IEEE) in 2015 for contributions to measurement methods and process technologies for micro-electromechanical systems.
