= Jeni Mundy =

British electrical engineer

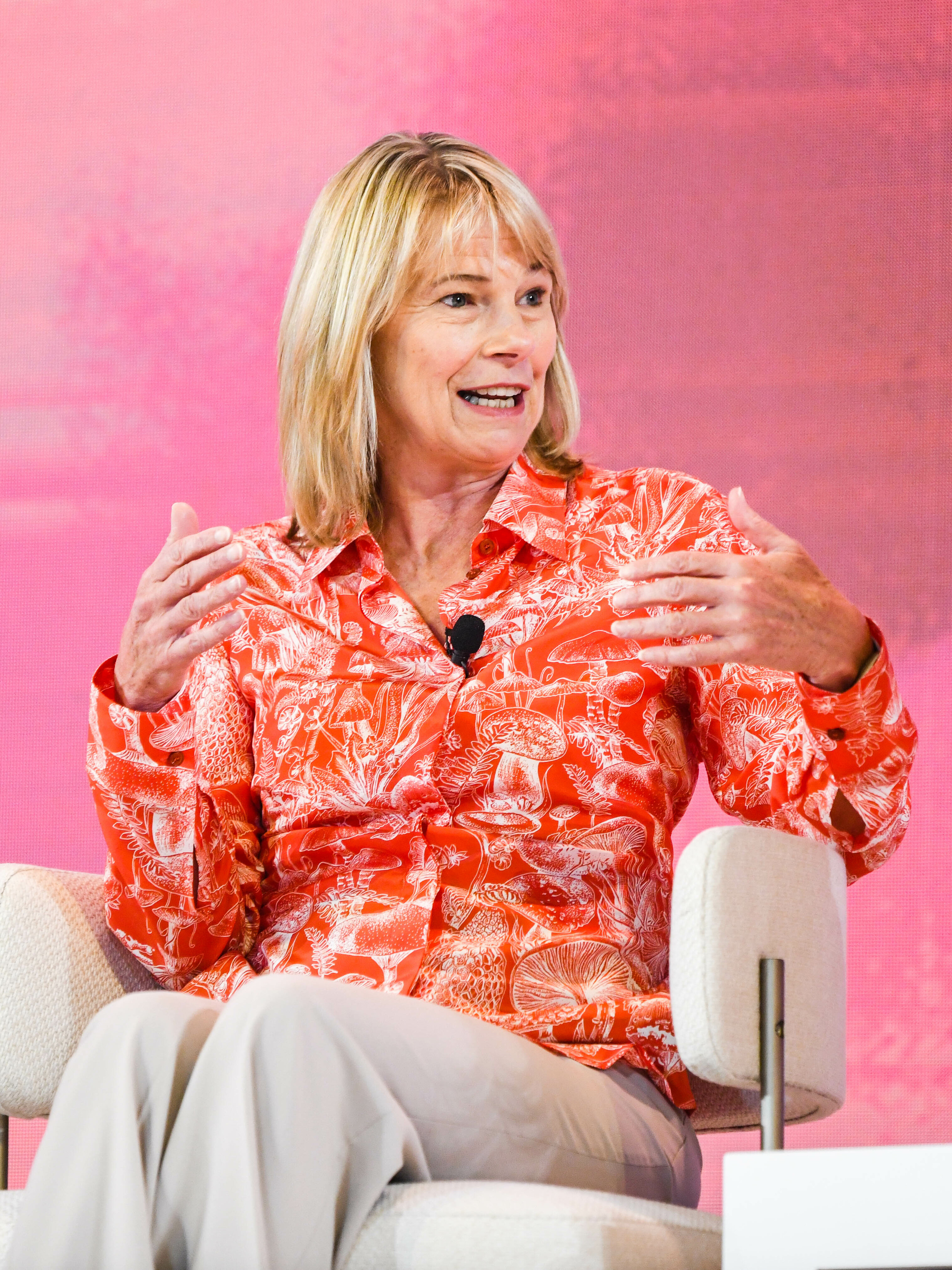
- Mundi in November 2022
- Awards: FREng
- Scientific career
- Fields: Electronic Engineering

Jenifer Mundy is an English yachtswoman, telecoms engineer and board member. She was the first female Chief Technology Officer for Vodafone, and is Managing Director UK and Ireland for Visa. Mundy was elected a Fellow of the Royal Academy of Engineering in 2011. She is one of the few women to compete twice in the Volvo Ocean Race 1989–90 on Maiden and 1993–94 on US Women's Challenge/Heineken.

== Life ==
Jeni Mundy was born in 1965. She was educated at the Lady Eleanor Holles School, a private day school in Hampton, from 1971 to 1981. She went on to study for a Bachelor degree in Maths with Philosophy at the University of East Anglia, before spending six years as a professional yachtswoman. Mundy then decided to study electronic engineering, having learned to fix electronics on yachts, earning an MSc at Cardiff University. Mundy emigrated from the UK to New Zealand with her New Zealand fiance in 1994, and began her telecoms career with Bellsouth as an RF engineer. By 2001 she was head of the technology team at Vodafone New Zealand (after the UK carrier bought up Bellsouth in 1998). She moved to the UK CTO position in 2007, ending her Vodafone career with Group Enterprise Director of Products and Innovations. She moved to Visa in 2018, where she is Managing Director UK and Ireland.

Mundy was elected a Fellow of the Royal Academy of Engineering in 2011.

== Yachting ==
Mundy is one of the few women to compete twice in the Volvo Ocean Race 1989-90 on Maiden and 1993-94 on US Women's Challenge/Heineken.
