= Robert Buchan =

Scottish-Canadian mining engineer and businessman

Robert M. Buchan
- Born: Robert MacKay Buchan; Rosyth, Fife, Scotland
- Education: Heriot-Watt University (BSc Mining); Queen's University (MSc Mining Engineering)
- Occupations: Mining engineer, businessman, philanthropist
- Years active: 1970s–present
- Known for: Founder of Kinross Gold
- Title: Former President & CEO, Kinross Gold
- Board member of: Allied Nevada Gold Corp.; Buchan Family Foundation
- Awards: Honorary Doctorate, Heriot-Watt University

Robert M. Buchan is a Scottish-Canadian mining engineer, businessman and philanthropist. He founded Kinross Gold in 1993 worth ($2.8B USD). It is now the 3rd-largest gold mining company in North America.

Brought up in Rosyth, Fife, Buchan graduated with a 1st class honours degree in Mining from Heriot-Watt University in Edinburgh in 1969. He earned a master's degree of Science in Mining Engineering from Queen's University in 1972.

In 2009 he gave £6 million to his Canadian alma mater, Queen's University, in Kingston, Ontario, to fund mining education and, in his honor, the university renamed the Mining Engineering department the Robert M. Buchan Department of Mining. In February 2025 it was announced that Buchan was donating £4.5 million to his Scottish alma mater, to fund their work sustainable energy engineering, the largest donation the university has ever received from an individual. He has also donated £650,000 to help establish the Whitlock Energy Collaboration Centre at Carnegie College in Fife.

== Career ==
Buchan retired as president and chief executive of Kinross Gold Corporation 10 January 2005, going on to found Katanga Copper, the developer of one of the world's largest copper deposits. He retired from Katanga Copper in 2007. He remains executive chairman and director of Allied Nevada Gold Corp., a gold mining firm that operates the Hycroft mine and has a large number of prospective exploration claims in the state of Nevada.

Buchan is a director of the Buchan Family Foundation, a philanthropic body.

Mr Buchan was elected to the board of Polyus Gold International in June 2008 and was elected chairman of the board July 2011. He stepped down from the board in 2013. "Polyus Gold International" is a Russian mining and metallurgy conglomerate primarily concerned with the production of gold.

Buchan received an Honorary Doctorate from Heriot-Watt University in 2011. In 2013 he became Chancellor of Heriot Watt University in Edinburgh, Scotland.
