= Hilary Mercer =

British engineer

Hilary Mary Mercer
- Born: January 1958 (age 68); United Kingdom
- Occupation: Engineer
- Known for: Work on oil and gas projects, especially in Pennsylvania

Hilary Mercer is a British engineer known for her work on oil and gas projects, especially in Pennsylvania. She has been elected to the Royal Academy of Engineering and the Institution of Mechanical Engineers.

== Early life ==
Mercer grew up in Manchester. She graduated in Engineering from St Hugh's College, Oxford.

== Career ==
She became vice president of Shell Pennsylvania Petrochemicals Complex in 2017.

She led Shell's integrated gas and Liquefied natural gas (LNG) projects (onshore and floating LNG) and later became responsibilities in the Pennsylvania petrochemicals complex in the United States.

Mercer is known for her work in management of large-scale oil and gas projects, specifically the Stanlow Oil Refinery, Shell Technology Centre the Sakhalin-II LNG Project, and the chemical processing plant in Monaca, Pennsylvania.

== Recognition ==
Mercer was elected to the Royal Academy of Engineering in 2018. She is a fellow of the Institution of Mechanical Engineers, and the Association of Project Management.
