= Agnes Kaposi =

British-Hungarian engineer

Dr Agnes Kaposi MBE FREng
- Engineering career
- Discipline: electrical engineering
- Institutions: London South Bank University
- Employer: Ericsson
- Website: https://agneskaposi.com/

Agnes Aranka Kaposi MBE FIEE FREng (born 20 October 1932) is a British-Hungarian engineer and author. In 1992 she became the third female to be elected a Fellow of the Royal Academy of Engineering. She was an emeritus professor in electrical engineering at London South Bank University. In 2020 she published her autobiography Yellow Star-Red Star. The book is a witness’s account of life in Hungary before and during the Second World War and under Communist rule, as well as of the author’s subsequent escape to Britain. She was appointed MBE in the 2022 New Year Honours for services to Holocaust Education and Awareness.

== Life ==
Born in Hungary, Kaposi survived the Debrecen ghetto and labour camps in Austria. She worked as a child labourer in the agricultural and armament camps of Austria. She returned to Hungary to live under the Stalinist communist regime. In 1956, she graduated from the Technical University of Budapest. with a degree in electrical /electronic engineering. She contributed to the development of the Hungarian TV broadcasting infrastructure. After the 1956 Uprising against Communist rule, she escaped from her native Hungary and obtained a labour permit to work in England as an industrial researcher in the Telecommunication and Computer industries.

She obtained a PhD in Computer Aided Design and worked as a lecturer, researcher and consultant in academic institutions and in the Telecommunication and Computer Industries in Britain. She worked for Ericsson.

She works closely with Beth Shalom, March of the Living, Echo Eternal and others. Her recently published memoir, Yellow Star – Red Star, written in cooperation with the Hungarian historian László Csősz, tells of the Hungarian Holocaust and life under communism.

Kaposi was appointed Member of the Order of the British Empire (MBE) in the 2022 New Year Honours for services to Holocaust education and awareness.

== Works ==
- Agnes Kaposi; Margaret Myers (1994). Systems, Models and Measures. ISBN 9783540197539.
- Agnes Kaposi; Margaret Myers (2001). Systems for All. ISBN 9781860942730.
- Agnes Kaposi, Yellow Star-Red Star, i2i Publishing
