= OneMine =

OneMine is non-profit entity and searchable online global mining and minerals library.

== History ==
OneMine is a non-profit entity governed by a steering committee whose members are nominated and serve for a term of three calendar years. It was launched as a collaborative effort between professional societies in the mining and minerals related fields to promote access to technical articles, periodicals, books, and other published work as research source for engineers in related disciplines. OneMine is a searchable online global mining and minerals library. OneMine currently contains more than 117,000 articles, technical papers, and other documents from mining societies around the world. Professional societies and associations in the mining, metallurgical, and tunneling communities may have their technical papers, journals, periodicals, and other published works considered for inclusion in the OneMine library.

== Contents ==
OneMine contains over 130 years of peer-reviewed works from professional societies including:

- AIME – The American Institute of Mining, Metallurgical, and Petroleum Engineers
- AusIMM – The Australasian Institute of Mining and Metallurgy
- CIM - The Canadian Institute of Mining, Metallurgy and Petroleum
- DFI – Deep Foundations Institute
- IMMS – International Marine Minerals Society
- IIMP - Instituto de Ingenieros de Minas del Peru
- NIOSH – National Institute for Occupational Safety and Health
- SAIMM – The Southern African Institute of Mining and Metallurgy
- SME – Society for Mining, Metallurgy, and Exploration
- TMS – The Minerals, Metals & Materials Society

Among the published works accessible in OneMine are:

- Mining Engineering Magazine peer-reviewed technical papers
- SME Transactions – an annual publication of peer-reviewed technical papers by the SME
- Tunneling and Underground Construction – a monthly periodical
- SME Annual Meeting Proceedings
- Technical papers by the AIME, AusIMM, CIM, DFI, IMMS, IIMP, NIOSH, SAIMM, SME and TMS.
- Proceedings from several years of International Mineral Processing Congress
