= Sarah Sharples =

Professor Sarah Sharples CBE FREng FIET
- Born: Sarah Catherine Nichols; 1 November 1972 (age 53); Kingston upon Thames
- Education: Wimbledon High School; University of Nottingham (BSc, MSc, PhD)
- Scientific career
- Fields: Psychology; Virtual Reality
- Workplaces: University of Nottingham; Department for Transport; University of Manchester
- Thesis: Virtual Reality Induced Symptoms and Effects (VRISE): methodological and the theoretical issues (1999)
- Website: www.nottingham.ac.uk/engineering/people/sarah.sharples

Sarah Catherine Sharples CBE FREng FIET (born 1972) is a British chartered ergonomist and academic specialising in human factors and ergonomics. She has served as Professor of Human Factors at the University of Nottingham since 2012 and chief scientific adviser for the Department for Transport since 2021. As of 2025 she has spent all her academic career at the University of Nottingham, and served as pro-vice-chancellor for equality, diversity and inclusion (EDI) from 2018 to 2021. In June 2025, it was announced that she would be joining the University of Manchester in September 2025 as vice-president and dean of its Faculty of Science and Engineering.

== Early life and education ==
Sharples was born on 1 November 1972 in Kingston upon Thames, England. She was educated at Wimbledon High School, an all-girls private school in London. She studied psychology, human factors, and engineering at the University of Nottingham (BSc, MSc, PhD). Her doctoral thesis investigated Virtual Reality Induced Symptoms and Effects (VRISE).

== Career and research ==
In 2024 she was elected a Fellow of the Royal Academy of Engineering (FREng) In 2025 she was appointed Vice President and Dean at the University of Manchester.
