= Susan Gourvenec =

British geoscientist

- Education: University of Southampton; University of Cambridge
- Scientific career
- Workplaces: Queen Mary and Westfield [University of Southampton
- Thesis: Three dimensional effects of diaphragm wall installation and staged construction sequences (1998)

Susan Gourvenec is a British geoscientist who is Professor of Offshore Geotechnical Engineering and deputy director of the Southampton Marine and Maritime Institute at the University of Southampton. She was elected a Fellow of the Royal Academy of Engineering in 2022.

== Early life and education ==
Gourvenec studied engineering at Queen Mary and Westfield, which is now part of Queen Mary University of London. She moved to the University of Southampton for research studies. Her doctoral research considered geotechnical engineering, and the development of 3D finite element limit analysis of wall installation. She was a postdoctoral research fellow at the University of Cambridge, where she spent two years before going to Perth. In Australia, Gourvenec worked at Advanced Geomechanics Pty, where she was a member of the Centre for Offshore Foundation Systems.

== Research and career ==
Gourvenec develops new technologies to understand ocean structures, including the seabed. These technologies include robotics, sensors and autonomous vehicles. She moved to the University of Southampton in 2017, and was named a Royal Academy of Engineering Chair in Emerging Technologies. She was elected Fellow of the Royal Academy of Engineering in 2022.

== Selected publications ==
- Randolph, M. F.; Gourvenec, Susan (2011). Offshore geotechnical engineering. Abingdon, Oxon: Spon Press. ISBN 978-0-203-88909-1. OCLC 727053453.
- Gourvenec, S.; Randolph, M. (2003-08-01). "Effect of strength non-homogeneity on the shape of failure envelopes for combined loading of strip and circular foundations on clay". Géotechnique. 53 (6): 575–586. Bibcode:2003Getq...53..575G. doi:10.1680/geot.2003.53.6.575. ISSN 0016-8505.
- Randolph, Mark F. (2012-05-29). "Offshore Geotechnics - the Challenges of Deepwater Soft Sediments". Geotechnical Engineering State of the Art and Practice. Reston, VA: American Society of Civil Engineers. pp. 241–271. doi:10.1061/9780784412138.0010. ISBN 9780784412138.
