= European Society for Biomaterials =

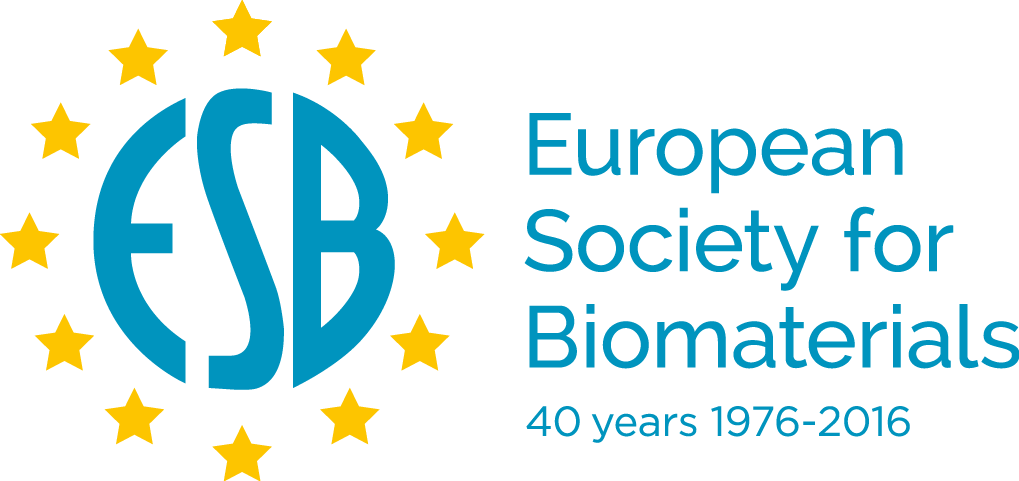
Logo of the ESB

The European Society for Biomaterials (ESB) is a non-profit organisation that encourages research and spread of information regarding research and uses of biomaterials. Founded in March 1976, became a member of the International Union of Societies for Biomaterials Sciences and Engineering (IUS-BSE) at its conception, in 1979. It has approximately 750 members in 33 different countries worldwide (2017). It organises an annual meeting where recent developments mainly within academic research of biomaterials are presented.

Professor Nicholas Dunne is the 14th president of the ESB elected in 2023.

The ESB home journal is the Journal of Materials Science: Materials in Medicine (ISSN 0957-4530) published by Springer. Each year a special issue of selected contributions to the annual conference is published.
