= Susan Partridge (engineer) =

Sue Partridge
- Born: Susan Partridge
- Education: University of Cambridge
- Engineering career
- Discipline: Aviation
- Employer(s): Airbus; Wing of Tomorrow

Sue Partridge is an aerospace engineer, who currently serves as the Airbus Commercial Aircraft UK Country Manager and is Head of the Wing of Tomorrow programme. Her first major role was on advancing wing technology for the A320neo and A330neo. Since then, Partridge has also held roles with the aim of lowering aviation's dependence on fossil fuels, including zero emission flights.

== Education ==
Partridge received her MA in Engineering from the University of Cambridge. She then obtained an MSc in Aerospace Manufacturing and Management with Distinction from the University of Bristol. She also completed a Postgraduate Diploma in Environmental Management with Distinction from the Open University.

== Career ==
Partridge's career with Airbus began in 1989 when she joined the company as an undergraduate engineering apprentice. In 2010, Partridge led wing development activities for the A320neo and A330neo programmes. The two models delivered crucial upgrades to the wing design, which had many benefits due to their lighter weight than previous designs.

In 2017, Partridge was appointed Head of the Wing of Tomorrow (WoT) programme. The programme is Airbus' largest research and technology initiative, focused on developing advanced wing technologies for future aircraft generations. The programme has received substantial funding from the Aerospace Technology Institute, with £117 million awarded since 2014, highlighting its importance to the UK's aerospace industry. In November 2023, she has spoken on the research Wing of Tomorrow is conducting into zero emission flights. Her work in aviation has led to industry recognition, including becoming a fellow of the Royal Academy of Engineering in 2024.
