= Fellow of the Royal Academy of Engineering =

- Sponsored by: Royal Academy of Engineering
- Location: London, UK
- Website: raeng.org.uk/fellows-directory

Fellowship of the Royal Academy of Engineering (FREng) is an award and fellowship for engineers who are recognised by the Royal Academy of Engineering as being the best and brightest engineers, inventors and technologists in the UK and from around the world to promote excellence in engineering and to enhance and support engineering research, policy formation, education and entrepreneurship and other activities that advance and enrich engineering in all its forms.

Fellowship is a significant honour. Up to 60 engineers are elected each year by their peers. Honorary and International Fellows are those who have made exceptional contributions to engineering.

The criteria for election are stated in the charter, statutes, and regulations document. The essential attributes of excellence in engineering include:

- Organisation and department leaders: those with full responsibility on technical decisions, those who have demonstrated significant personal engineering achievements
- Top Engineers, academics or researchers: whose work have resulted in new products, important processes or practices, those who have made outstanding contributions to major projects.

Fellows are entitled to use the post-nominal letters FREng; prior to the royal charter in 1983, FEng was used. Honorary fellows use the post-nominal HonFREng.

See Category:Fellows of the Royal Academy of Engineering for examples of fellows and Category:Honorary Fellows of the Royal Academy of Engineering.

== See also ==
- List of female fellows of the Royal Academy of Engineering
- List of International Fellows of the Royal Academy of Engineering
