= List of University of Reading alumni =

This is a list of University of Reading alumni.

== Academics ==
- Catherine Abbott - Professor of Molecular Genetics at the University of Edinburgh
- Fatima Akilu – Nigerian psychologist and head of major national program of de-radicalisation to tackle Boko Haram
- Ash Amin – Professor of Geography, University of Cambridge
- Simon Batterbury, Professor of Environmental Studies, geographer at the University of Melbourne
- Janet Beer – Vice-Chancellor of the University of Liverpool (formerly Vice-Chancellor of Oxford Brookes University)
- L. J. F. Brimble – botanist and editor of Nature magazine
- Sir Clifford Charles Butler – co-discoverer of hyperons and mesons, Professor of Physics at Imperial College London, Vice-chancellor of Loughborough University
- Stephen E. Calvert – Emeritus Professor of Geology, University of British Columbia
- David Carpanini – Emeritus Professor of Art, University of Wolverhampton
- Michael Cox – Professor of International Relations, London School of Economics
- Sir Peter Crane – Professor of Botany, Yale University
- Athanassios Ganas – Geologist, Research Director National Observatory of Athens Greece, President Geological Society of Greece
- Beate Hermelin (1920–2008) – German-born experimental psychologist, who worked in the UK
- Sean Holly – Professor of Economics, University of Cambridge
- Jolyon Howorth – Professor of European politics, University of Bath and Visiting Professor of Political Science at Yale University
- Michael Leifer – was a professor of International Relations, London School of Economics
- Jane Lewis - Barnett Professor of Social Policy at the University of Oxford
- David Marks – Professor of Psychology, City University London
- Dragan Marušič – Professor of Mathematics at the University of Ljubljana
- Sarah Mercer – Professor of linguistics at the University of Graz
- Mark Nixon – Emeritus Professor of Electronics and Computer Science at University of Southampton
- Avi Shlaim – Professor of International Relations, University of Oxford
- Nigel Smart (cryptographer)
- Zohrah Sulaiman – Vice-Chancellor of Universiti Teknologi Brunei
- John R. Terry – Professor of Biomedical Modelling, University of Exeter
- June Thoburn – Emeritus Professor of Social Work at the University of East Anglia
- Ethelwynn Trewavas – ichthyologist and taxonomist
- John Turner – Professor of Engineering and Pro-Vice Chancellor of the University of Portsmouth
- Janet Watson - geologist
- Sean Whelan (scientist) – Professor of Microbiology at Harvard Medical School
- A. E. Wilder-Smith – creationist and chemist

== Broadcasting ==
- Julian Barratt – comedian, BBC's The Mighty Boosh
- Keith Bosley – former BBC broadcaster and prizewinning poet and translator
- Richard Holmes – military historian and television presenter
- Julian Richards – archaeologist and broadcaster
- Richard Sambrook – Director of the BBC World Service
- Tomasz Schafernaker – TV weather presenter
- Nick Thorpe – BBC Central Europe correspondent (1996–); formerly BBC Budapest correspondent
- Laura Tobin – TV weather presenter
- Jay Wynne – TV weather presenter

== Business ==
- Richard Adam - former finance director of Carillion
- David Atkins – Chief Executive, Hammerson plc
- Linda Bennett - English-Icelandic clothing designer and entrepreneur
- Nick Candy – Co-Founder and partner of high end property development company, Candy & Candy, London
- Gavin Grant – Chief Executive of the Royal Society for the Prevention of Cruelty to Animals
- Nicky Kinnaird – founder and president of British cosmetic retailer Space NK
- Robert Noel – businessman, Chief Executive of Land Securities Group plc
- Noel Stockdale – Co-founder of Asda

== Military ==
- Lieutenant-Colonel Rupert Thorneloe - Welsh Guards officer killed in action in Afghanistan
- Lance Corporal Oliver Thomas - killed in action (2014) in Afghanistan
- Wilfred Owen - First World War poet and soldier

== Music ==
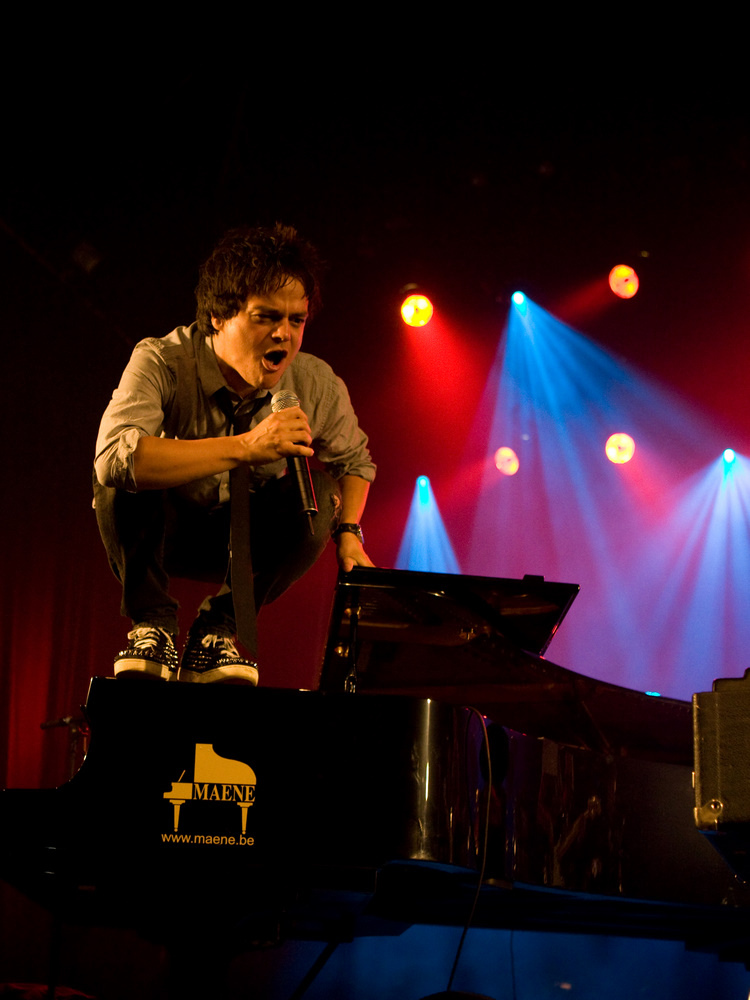
Jamie Cullum, pianist and singer

- Rotimi Alakija – Nigerian disc jockey, record producer and recording artist.
- Rick Battersby – member of the band Twelfth Night
- Arthur Brown – rock and roll singer
- Alan Clayson – singer, composer, record producer, leader of the band Clayson and the Argonauts
- Jamie Cullum – jazz pianist and singer
- Brian Devoil – member of the band Twelfth Night
- Falz – Nigerian musician and actor
- Folarinwale Elemide – more commonly known as The Flowolf, a 21st-century Nigerian rapper and singer-songwriter
- Liam Howe – music producer, musician, formed the band Sneaker pimps with David Westlake and Joe Wilson (musician) also alumni
- Hilary James – singer, double bassist, guitarist, and mando-bassist
- Andy MacKay – member of the band Roxy Music
- Geoff Mann – member of the band Twelfth Night
- Simon Mayor – mandolinist, fiddle player, guitarist, and composer
- Clive Mitten – member of the band Twelfth Night
- Martin Noble – musician, Noble in the band British Sea Power
- Andy Revell – member of the band Twelfth Night
- Edmund Rubbra – composer
- Julian Wagstaff – composer
- Scott Wilkinson – musician and composer, Yan in the band British Sea Power

== Politics ==
- Anton Apriantono, Indonesian politician
- Dimeji Bankole – Nigerian politician and Speaker of the House of Representatives of Nigeria
- Sharon Bowles, British Liberal Democrats European politician.
- Harriet Cross, British Conservative Party politician
- Daniel Feetham, Gibraltarian politician
- Fred Gardiner, Canadian politician
- Gilbert Seidu Iddi, Ghanaian politician
- Edison James, Prime Minister of Dominica 1995–2000
- Morgan Jones, British Labour Party politician, the first conscientious objector to be elected to Parliament after the First World War
- Shukuru Kawambwa, Tanzanian Government Minister
- Jan Kavan, Czech diplomat and politician
- Rupert Lowe, Restore Britain politician
- Penny Mordaunt, British Conservative Party politician
- Tony Page, British Labour Party politician
- Mike Penning, British Conservative Party politician
- Frauke Petry, German Politician
- Mark Prisk, British Conservative Party politician
- Hugh Robertson, British Conservative Party politician
- Adrienne Ryan - Australian politician
- Sophie Walker, British Women's Equality Party politician
- Rob Wilson, British Conservative Party politician
- Sean Woodcock, Labour MP for Banbury 2024-present

== Sport ==
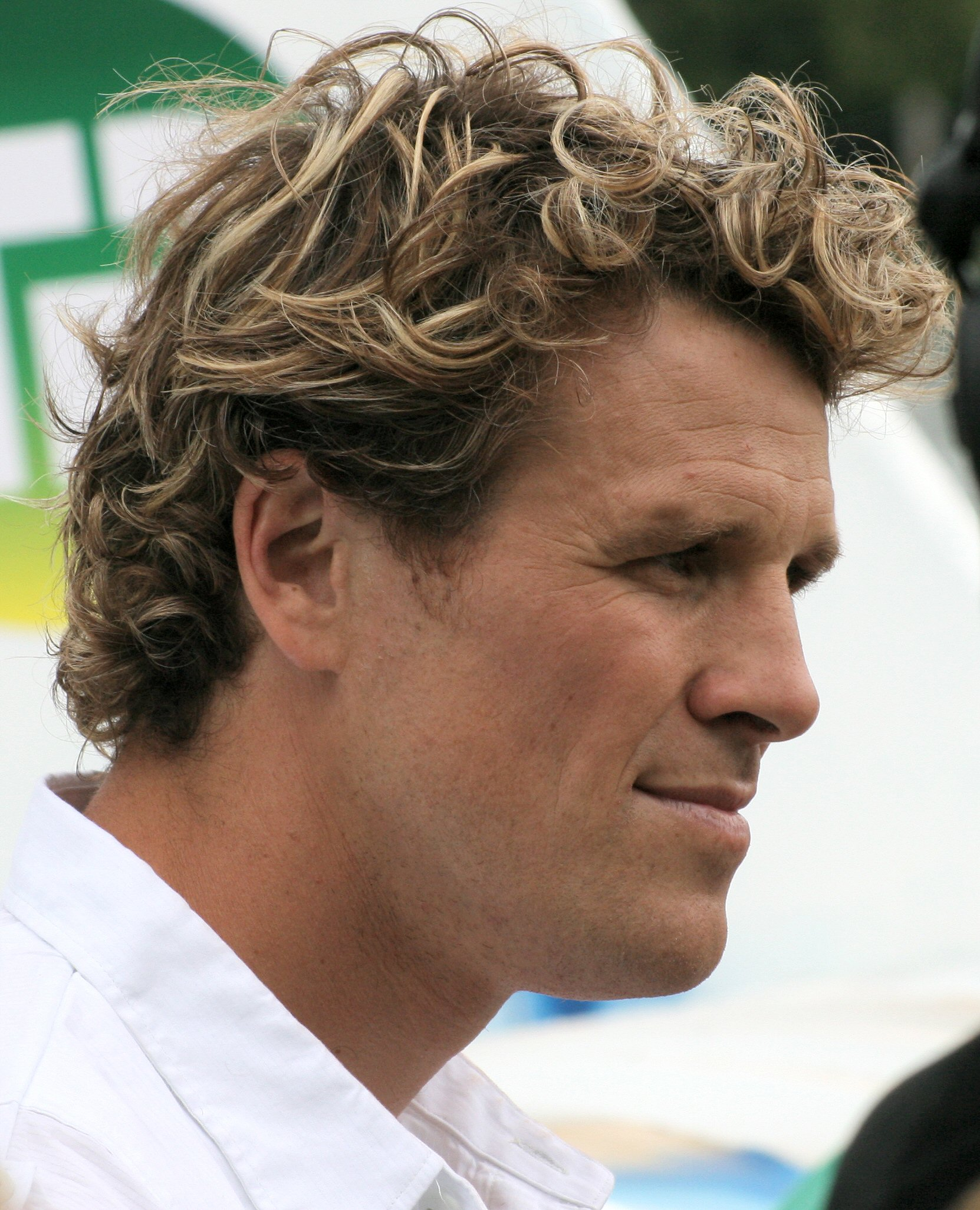
James Cracknell, Olympic gold medallist in rowing

- David Bedford – runner, former 10,000m world record holder
- Cath Bishop – rower, silver medallist in the coxless pairs at the 2004 Olympics
- James Cracknell – rower, gold medallist in the coxless fours at the 2000 Olympics and 2004 Olympics
- Adrian Ellison – rower, gold medallist in the coxed four at the 1984 Olympics
- Debbie Flood – rower, silver medallist in the quadruple sculls at the 2004 Olympics
- Ed Fuller – rower, gold medallist in the PR3 mixed coxed four at the 2024 Summer Paralympics
- Alex Gregory – rower, gold medallist in the coxless fours at the 2012 Olympics
- Garry Herbert – rower, gold medallist in the coxed pairs at the 1992 Olympics
- Molly Hide – cricketer, captained the English women's team for seventeen years
- Will Hoy – racing driver, British Touring Car Champion in 1991
- Bill Lucas – rower
- Anna Watkins – rower, gold medallist in the double sculls at the 2012 Olympics

== Writing and art ==
- Steven Atkinson – Theatre director, and artistic director of HighTide Festival Theatre
- Anne Bean – Installation and performance artist
- Audrey Blackman - Sculptor, potter
- Jane Carpanini – Artist
- Simon Claridge - Artist
- Vincent Connare – Creator of Comic Sans
- Jeff Evans – Beer writer
- Cherryl Fountain – Artist
- Robert Gillmor – Ornithologist, artist, illustrator, author and editor
- Elizabeth Goudge - Carnegie Medal winning novelist
- Kathleen Hale – Artist and children's author, the Orlando the Marmalade Cat series
- Ingrid Kerma - European artist
- Robin Kinross - Writer
- Myfanwy Kitchin – Artist
- Alan Morrison - Poet
- Mike Nelson – Installation artist
- Yvonne Adhiambo Owuor Award winning Kenyan writer of Luo Nationality
- Kusha Petts – Artist and writer
- Michael Rosen – Children's author, poet, presenter, political columnist, broadcaster, activist, and academic
- Joan Smith – Novelist and journalist
- Hilary Summers – Welsh singer
- David Watkins – Designer of the London 2012 Olympics medals
- Richard Wilson – Installation artist

== Others ==
- Lorna Arnold – British historian
- Eve Balfour – farmer, educator, organic farming pioneer, and a founding figure in the organic movement
- Robin Bextor – film and television director, father of Sophie Ellis-Bextor
- Pippa Greenwood - TV plant pathologist
- Bunny Guinness - landscape architect
- Azahari Husin – leading member of the Jemaah Islamiyah group, believed to have been involved in the 2002 and 2005 Bali bombings
- Helen Mulholland – Irish master blender
- Lucy Muyoyeta – Zambian women's rights activist, social development consultant and writer
- Clive Ponting – civil servant who faced trial for the leaking of information on the sinking of the Belgrano, during the Falklands War
- Kondwa Sakala-Chibiya – Zambian lawyer
- Brian Skinner – English Anglican bishop in Chile
- John Tabatabai – professional poker player
- Tang Wei – actress, Ang Lee's Lust, Caution
- Ibrahim Taguri - British community worker
- Rachel Treweek – Bishop of Gloucester; the first female diocesan bishop in the Church of England, and first female Lord Spiritual
- David Welch - horticulturist who was director of parks in Aberdeen and was later chief executive of the Royal Parks Agency
- Carl Wright - civil servant former director of the Commonwealth Trade Union Group and Secretary-General of the Commonwealth Local Government Forum
