= Goldsmiths' Professor of Materials Science =

The Goldsmiths' Professorship of Materials Science is a professorship in the University of Cambridge, associated with the Department of Materials Science and Metallurgy.

The professorship was established by grace of 20 November 1931 as the Goldsmiths' Professorship of Metallurgy to replace the Goldsmiths' Readership in Metallurgy. A further gift of £12,500 was received from the Goldsmiths' Company in 1933. It was retitled the Goldsmiths' Professorship of Materials Science by grace 4 of 19 June 1991.

== Goldsmiths' Professors of Metallurgy ==
- 1932 Robert Hutton (retired 1942)
- 1945 George Wesley Austin
- 1958 Sir Alan Cottrell (resigned 1965)
- 1966 Robert Honeycombe
- 1984 Derek Hull (retired 1991)
- 1990 Sir Colin John Humphreys
- 2008 Anthony Cheetham

== Goldsmiths' Professors of Materials Science ==
- 2018 Manish Chhowalla

== Sources ==
- Cambridge University Officers
