= Richard Ragan =

WFP Representative of the United Nations

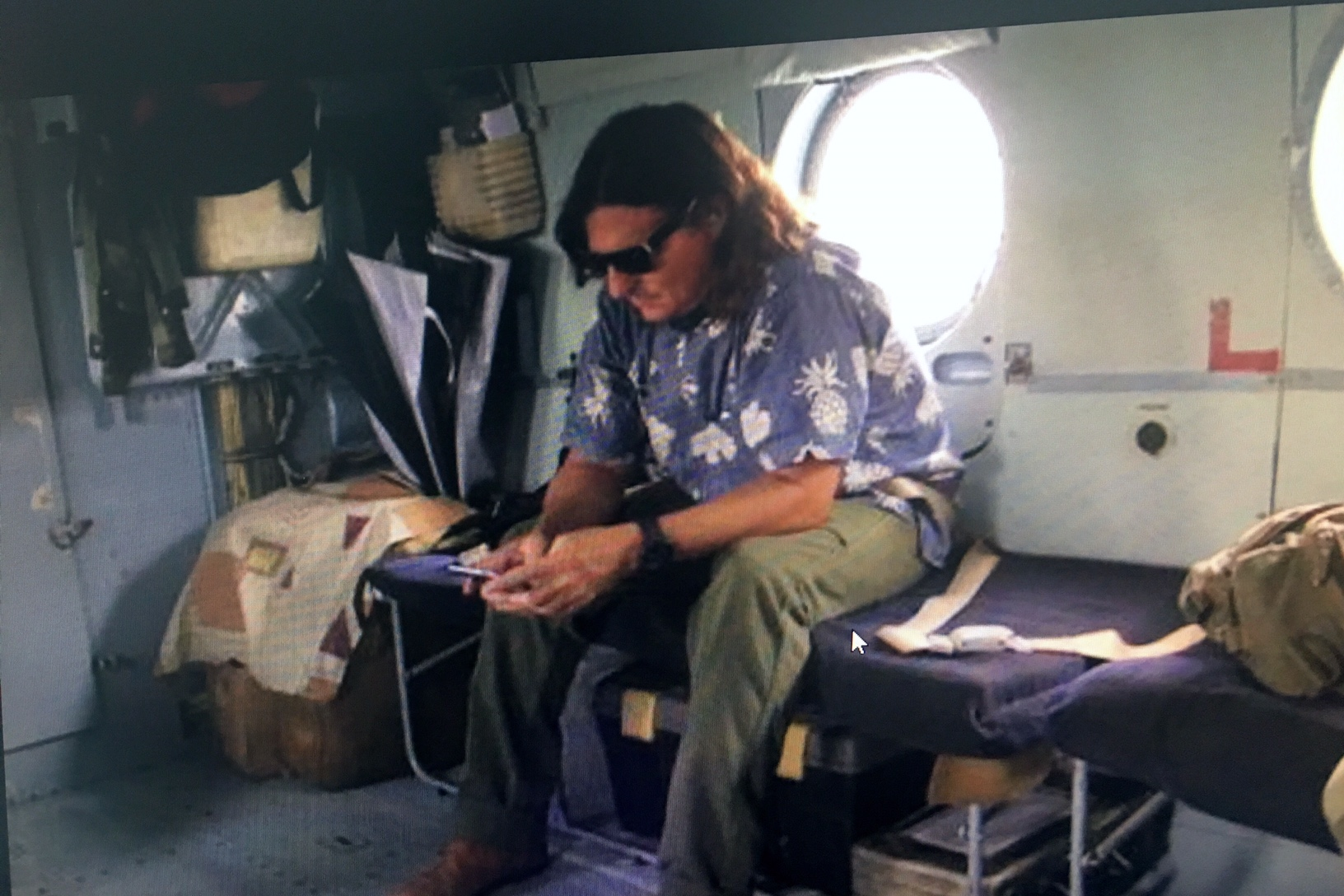
- Richard Ragan in Greenville, Liberia in 2014
- Born: June 10, 1964 (age 62); Norfolk, Virginia, United States
- Occupations: UN Diplomat; Humanitarian Worker
- Awards: Secretary of Defense's Award of Excellence (1994); National Defense Outstanding Service in Operations other than War (1995); Nepal Red Cross Outstanding Humanitarian Award (2008); Mountain Institute Mountain Hero Award (2010); Nepal Mountaineering Association Harka Gurung Mountaineering Award (2016)

Richard Ragan (born June 10, 1964) is a senior staff member for the United Nations and is currently the United Nations WFP Representative in Ukraine. As the Director of Operations, he opened the Liberia Office and managed operations as part of the UN Secretary General's Ebola Emergency Response Mission (UNMEER), and was the UNWFP Emergency Co-ordinator for the 2015 Nepal earthquake response. He's spent time in the private sector as the Senior Director with Vulcan, Microsoft Co-Founder Paul Allen's company. Also with the UN World Food Programme he has served as the (WFP) Representative to Yemen, Bangladesh, Tanzania, Nepal, North Korea, Zambia, and worked on emergencies in East Timor, Kosovo and China. He also re-opened WFP's office in Libya after it was evacuated in 2014. Ragan appears regularly in both international and national media, and is listed in the book, Mississippians, which features famous people from the state of Mississippi.

== Biography ==
=== Early career ===
Ragan served as a US Peace Corps Volunteer in the Sierra Madre Mountains of the Philippines. Working as an agriculture extensionist, he lived with Ilongots in Quirino Province. The Ilongots are considered the Philippines’ last ritual head-hunters and were the subjects of Dr. Michelle Rosaldo's book, Knowledge and Passion: Ilongot Notions of Self and Social Life. Living among the semi-nomadic Ilongots, Ragan worked on agriculture and land reform issues. Following his Peace Corps experience, Ragan worked with the Public Policy Think Tank, the International Center for Development Policy, for the US House of Representatives Veterans Affairs Committee, and as a Foreign Policy Aide for Congressman Les Aspin from Wisconsin.

=== Clinton administration ===
Ragan held a number of jobs in the Clinton Administration; as an official in the Secretary of Defense's office, as a Director on the National Security Council, and as a Deputy Assistant Administrator in the US Agency for International Development (USAID).

Serving in The Pentagon, he led the team that designed the Humanitarian Daily Ration (HDR), a culturally appropriate, air-droppable, ready-to-eat ration that was first used in airdrops over Bosnia and is often provided by the US military in humanitarian crisis. In 1996, as the Director of Democracy, Human Rights and Humanitarian Affairs on President Clinton's national security team, he was the first White House official to visit North Korea. As the Deputy Assistant Administrator in the Bureau of Humanitarian Response (BHR), he was in charge of the Government's food and humanitarian aid programs.

=== United Nations ===
Ragan first joined the UN in 1998 as the WFP Deputy Representative to China. During that time, he managed WFP's response to the 1998 Yangtze River floods while also serving in Kosovo and East Timor, during the period both countries faced conflict.

In 2001, Ragan joined the UN full-time serving as WFP's Representative to Zambia. During the Southern African drought of 2002-2003, he faced the difficult challenge of turning back thousands of tons of genetically modified food aid in the face of 3.5 million starving people. Ragan then took over WFP's operation in North Korea (2003). His wife and young daughter accompanied him and are the only American family to have ever been allowed to officially reside in the country. During that time Ragan ran one of the largest operations in WFP's history, feeding 6.5 million people out of a population of 22 million. He also served as the acting Humanitarian Coordinator (HC), and was the last HC to serve in North Korea. The UN Office for Humanitarian Affairs was asked to leave North Korea in 2005. In Nepal, during his four-year tenure, Ragan expanded WFP's annual program from US$25 million to US$125 million to address the “silent food crises” that gripped the country. In 2014, Ragan served as the Head of Operations in Liberia for UNMEER and helped manage the UN's response in that country at the height of West Africa's Ebola crisis. Having managed large-scale operations, one of his key professional interests is to bring innovation in large organizations.

=== Personal ===
Ragan is married to Marcela Sandoval, also a former Clinton Administration official, and Le Cordon Bleu trained chef, who has worked at Kinkead's in Washington DC and The Courtyard Restaurant in Beijing China, among other places. They live on Bainbridge Island in Washington State and have three children, twins Carter and CoCo and daughter Zoey who is the only American child to ever live in North Korea. His Uncle Lattie Michael founded the fast-food chain Backyard Burgers.

Ragan graduated from SIT in Brattleboro, Vermont with an MA in International Development, and from Ole Miss with a BS in Business. With a personal interest in exploration, he provided sponsorship and support to the historic 2008 all Nepali female expedition to Mount Everest. The team, considered the most successful female expedition on the mountain, put all 10 members on the summit. He has also climbed with Russell Brice, and snowboarded with Craig Calonica on some of the world's highest peaks. In 2008, he narrowly escaped an avalanche on Annapurna South. He is an avid surfer regularly riding surf breaks around the globe.

He previously wrote a monthly newspaper column in The Cleveland Current about the humorous side of living abroad with his family. Ragan collaborated with photographer and Kathmandu based art dealer James Giambrone to produce a photography book The Life of Food in Nepal which features images and stories about the life, the land, and the ritual of Nepal's food. Collaborating with Kiran Joshi of Incessant Rain they produced Nepal's first 3-D animation short. Ragan served on the Board for the Center for Infectious Disease Research in Zambia (CIDRZ) for over a decade. Working again with Giambrone, he produced the documentary "Holding up the Sky" which tells the personal stories of 10 women climbing Mount Kilimanjaro.

=== Cameo ===
Ragan appeared in Bangladesh's first film on surfing, titled "Dare To Surf" (original title No Dorai). In the movie, he is an enthusiast traveler who discovers the sport on Cox's Bazar beach and asks the protagonist to teach him the technique. Besides showing the beauties of Bangladesh, the movie denounces the condition of girls and women in the country.

== See also ==
- List of people from Mississippi
