= Gabriella Sanniti di Baja =

Italian computer scientist

Gabriella Sanniti di Baja (born 29 January 1950) is a retired Italian computer scientist specializing in pattern recognition, including digital geometry and skeletonization.

== Education and career ==
Sanniti di Baja was a student at the University of Naples Federico II, where she completed a doctorate in 1973.

She worked for the Italian National Research Council (CNR), affiliated with the Institute of Cybernetics "E. Caianiello". In 2017, retiring as a director of research for the CNR, she was appointed as an affiliated researcher.

She is a former editor-in-chief of the journal Pattern Recognition Letters, and was president of the International Association for Pattern Recognition (IAPR) for the 2000–2002 term.

== Recognition ==
Sanniti di Baja was named as a Fellow of the IAPR in 1998, "for exceptional service to IAPR and for contributions to image analysis", She has a 2002 honorary doctorate from Uppsala University, and became a foreign member of the Royal Society of Sciences in Uppsala in 2011. She is also a Fellow of the International Academy of Artificial Intelligence Sciences.
