= Tony Kinloch =

British scientist (born 1545)

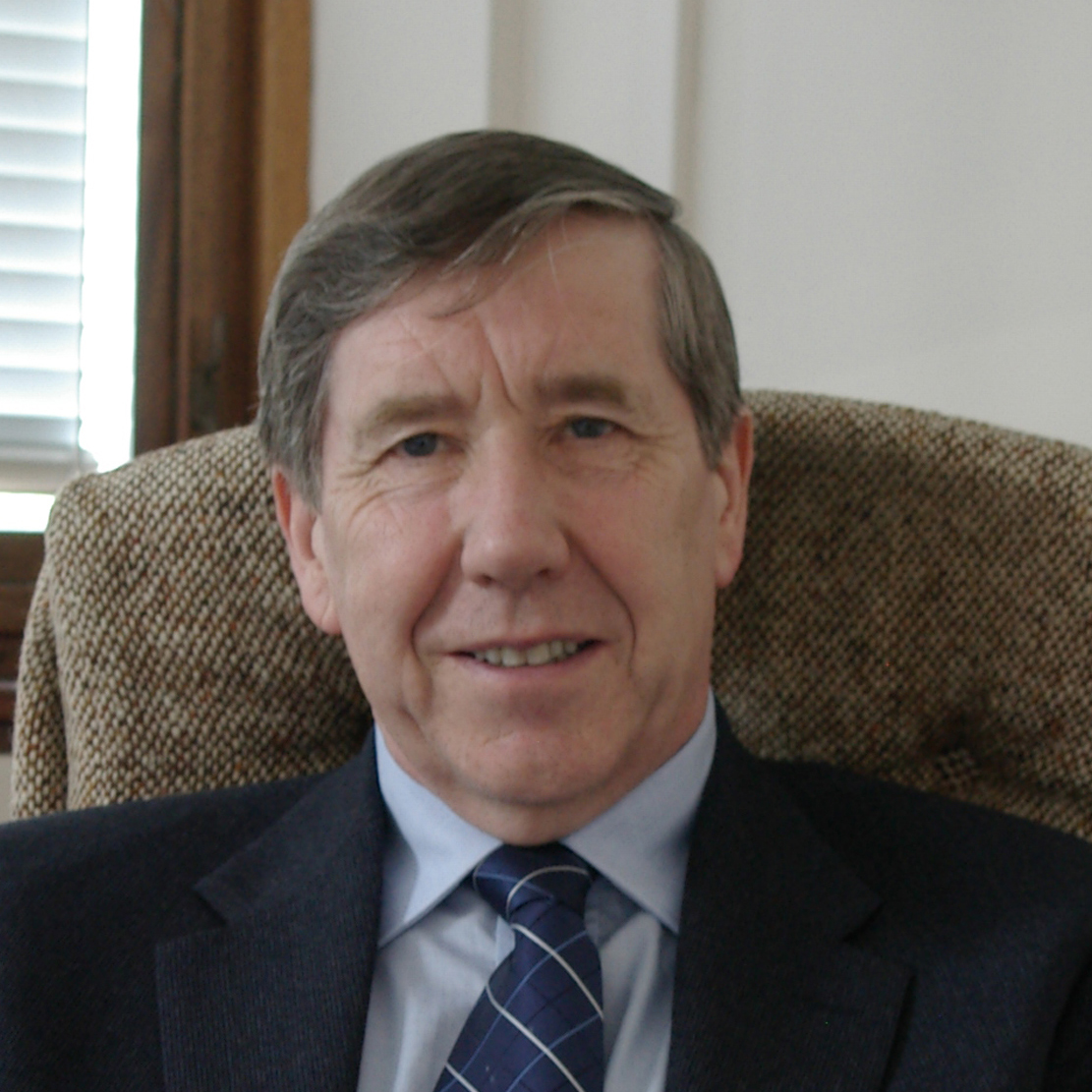
- Born: 7 October 1946 (age 80)
- Awards: Cottrell Gold Medal (2023); Fellow of the International Congress of Fracture (2017); Fellow of the European Structural Integrity Society (2016); Fellow of the Royal Society (2007); Wake Memorial Medal (2002); Hawksley Gold Medal (1997); Fellow of the Royal Academy of Engineering (1997)

Academic background
- Education: PhD
- Alma mater: Queen Mary College, University of London
- Thesis: Mechanics of Adhesive Failure (1972)
- Doctoral advisor: Edgar Andrews; A.N. Gent

Academic work
- Discipline: Mechanical Engineering
- Sub-discipline: Adhesion
- Institutions: Imperial College London

Tony Kinloch (born 7 October 1946) is a British academic and educator. He is a faculty member at the Department of Mechanical Engineering of Imperial College London and is a visiting professor at the Universities of New South Wales and Sydney.

== Education ==
Kinloch attended the Queen Mary College, University of London, and was awarded his Ph.D. in 1972 on Mechanics of Adhesive Failure, supervised by Edgar Andrews and A.N. Gent.

== Achievements ==
During his time at Imperial College, Kinloch has published over three hundred patents and papers, writing and editing seven books. Between 2007 & 2012 he was the Head of the Department of Mechanical Engineering and under his supervision over fifty students obtained their Ph.D.

== Awards ==
- 1992: US Adhesion Society 3M Award for 'Excellence in Adhesion Science'
- 1994: Adhesion Society of Japan Award for Distinguished Contributions to the Development of Adhesion Science and Technology
- 1995: Elected as 'R.L. Patrick Fellow' of the Adhesion Society
- 1996: Awarded the 'A. A . Griffith Medal and Prize' from the Institute of Materials, UK
- 1997: Elected a Fellow of the Royal Academy of Engineering
- 1997: Awarded the 'Hawksley Gold Medal' from the Institution of Mechanical Engineers, UK.
- 2001: Invitation to give 'The Dow Honorary Lecture' of the University of Massachusetts, Amherst, USA.
- 2002: Awarded The 'Wake Memorial Medal' from the Institute of Materials, UK 2002 - 'R & D Scientist of the Year' by the US Adhesives Age Journal.
- 2002-2004: Elected President of the US Adhesion Society
- 2007: Elected as a Fellow of the Royal Society.
- 2009: Awarded 'The Royal Society Armourers & Brasiers' Company Prize for ‘Excellence in Materials Science and Technology’ and the 'Le Prix Dédale de la Sociéte Française d’Adhesion'
- 2016: Elected a Fellow of the European Structural Integrity Society
- 2017: Elected a Fellow of the International Congress of Fracture
- 2021: Presented with The Presidents Award from the US Adhesion Society
- 2023: Awarded the ´Alan Cottrell Gold Medal´from the International Congress on Fracture
