= William Bonfield =

British material scientist

Professor William Bonfield CBE FRS FREng FMedSci

Professor of Medical Materials, University of Cambridge
- In office 2000–2005

Personal details
- Born: 6 March 1937 (age 89)

William Bonfield (born 6 March 1937) is a British material scientist, and Emeritus Professor of Medical Materials in the University of Cambridge.

== Life ==
He earned a BSc with First Class Honours, and PhD at Imperial College, London. He was a senior research scientist at the Honeywell Research Center from 1961 to 1968. He taught at Queen Mary College, becoming the chairman of the school of engineering, and dean of engineering. He was director of the University of London Interdisciplinary Research Centre (IRC) in Biomedical Materials. In 1991 he was awarded the A. A. Griffith Medal and Prize.

He was professor of medical materials, at the University of Cambridge. He directed the Cambridge Centre for Medical Materials, and the Pfizer Institute of Pharmaceutical Materials Science.

Honours and recognition

Bonfield was elected a Fellow of the Royal Society in 2003 and of the Academy of Medical Sciences in 2010.
