= Manish Chhowalla =

Material scientist

Manish Chhowalla FREng is a material scientist who has been the Goldsmiths' Professor of Materials Science at the University of Cambridge since 2018. In early 2024 he received a £2.5 million grant for his research. Also that year he was named the editor-in-chief of MRS Energy & Sustainability. Chhowalla previously worked at Rutgers University, where he was a professor of materials science and director of the Rutgers Institute for Advanced Materials, Devices and Nanotechnology.

He received a PhD from Churchill College, Cambridge. In 2020 the Institute of Materials, Minerals and Mining awarded him the A. A. Griffith Medal and Prize.
