= Edgar Andrews =

English physicist and engineer

Edgar H. Andrews FInstP FIMMM CEng CPhys
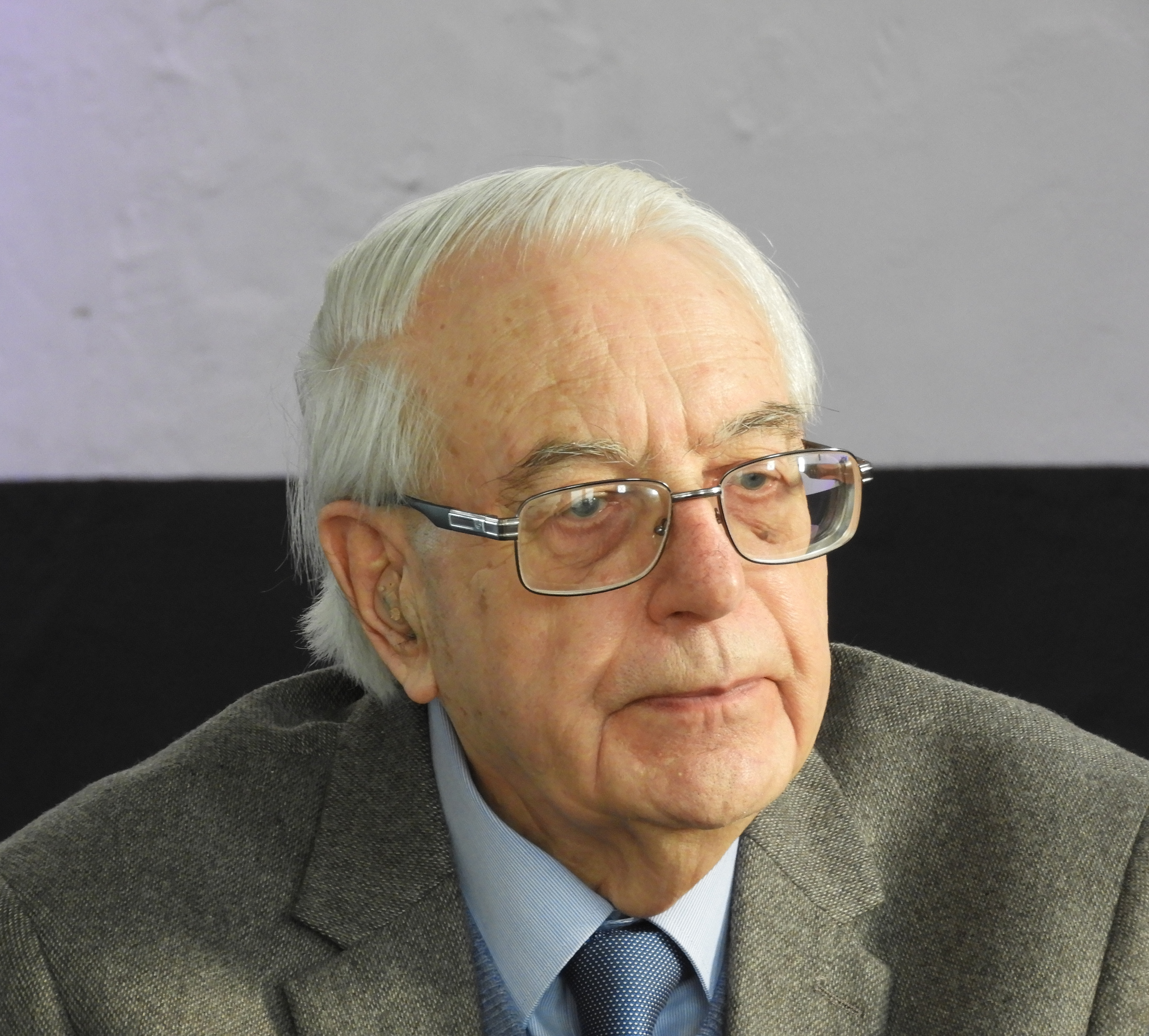
- Andrews in 2018
- Born: 16 December 1932 (age 93); Didcot
- Citizenship: British
- Education: University College London
- Known for: Theory of fracture; Crystallisation of polymers; Structure-property relationships in polymers; Science and faith studies
- Awards: A. A. Griffith Medal and Prize 1977
- Scientific career
- Fields: Physics, Materials Science, Science and religion
- Workplaces: Imperial Chemical Industries; Natural Rubber Producers' Research Association; Queen Mary University of London; Biblical Creation Society
- Thesis: Fracture phenomena in elastomers (1960)
- Doctoral advisor: Leonard Mullins
- Doctoral students: Tony Kinloch
- Website: https://whatisman.org

Edgar Harold Andrews (born 16 December 1932) is an English physicist and engineer known for his creationist views. He is emeritus professor of materials science at Queen Mary, University of London.

== Education ==
Andrews graduated with a B.Sc. degree in theoretical physics from the University of London in 1953. He then earned a Ph.D. in applied physics in 1960 with a specialisation in solid-state physics and a second doctorate, a D.Sc., in physics in 1968.

He is a Fellow of the Institute of Physics (FInstP), Fellow of the Institute of Materials, Minerals and Mining (FIMMM), Chartered Engineer (CEng, UK) and Chartered Physicist (CPhys).

Andrews is also an international expert on the science of polymers (large molecules).

== Career ==
From 1953 to 1955, Andrews was a technical officer at Imperial Chemical Industries Ltd., Welwyn Garden City. From 1955 to 1963 he was a senior physicist at the Natural Rubber Producers' Research Association, also in Welwyn. From 1963 to 1968 he was a reader in materials science. In 1967 he set up the Department of Materials at Queen Mary College, University of London, and served both as its head (from 1968 to 1980) and as Dean of Engineering (1971–1974). From 1968 to 1998 he was professor of materials at Queen Mary and Westfield College.

Besides his work at the university, he was also a director of: QMC Industrial Research London (1970–1988), Denbyware PLC (1971–1981, non-executive director), Materials Technology Consultants Ltd (1974–present), Evangelical Press (1975–2004) and Fire and Materials Ltd (1985–1988). For five years he was a member of the scientific advisory board of Neste Oy, the national oil company of Finland (which later sold its chemical division and became Neste Oil). He was and remains the first president of the Biblical Creation Society, and was editor of Evangelical Times (1998–2008).

Andrews was an international consultant to the Dow Chemical Company (US) for over thirty years and to the 3M Company (US) for twenty years. He also acted for many years as an expert scientific witness in a variety of cases in the British High Court and in courts in the US and Canada.

He has published over 100 scientific research papers and books, together with two Bible commentaries and various works on science and religion and on theology. His book From Nothing to Nature has been translated into ten languages.

In 1987 he co-founded the Campus Church in Welwyn Garden City, Hertfordshire, which is now called Garden City Church. He serves there as an elder.

== Recognition and awards ==
On 28–30 September 1972, Andrews was one of four speakers invited to address an international audience of over 400 scientists at the Michigan Molecular Institute's Dedication Symposium, along with Nobel Laureates Paul J. Flory and Melvin Calvin, and Donald Lyman.

Several of his research articles have appeared in the Proceedings of the Royal Society.

In 1977 Andrews was awarded the A. A. Griffith Medal and Prize by the Materials Science Club for contributions to materials science.

== Creationist views ==
Andrews is described by historian of creationism Ronald Numbers as the United Kingdom's "most respected creationist scientist of the late twentieth century", a Reformed Baptist, and a convert to Whitcomb and Morris' flood geology since the 1960s. However, Andrews rejected some elements of the latter, particularly dogmatic acceptance of a young Earth, even going so far as to suggest that the first day of creation "might be of indefinite length". However, on page 106 of his latest book Who made God?, Andrews notes – citing from his earlier work From nothing to Nature (chapter 9) – that he believes the whole universe, including the earth, was created ex-nihilo in verse 1, 'with no reference to how long ago that happened'. From verse 2 onward 'the account concentrates squarely on the earth itself'. Andrews follows E. J. Young in seeing Genesis 1:1 as describing the creation of the whole universe including the earth, with verse 2 onwards relating to the population of an 'old' earth with young features (both geographical and biological). Young Biosphere creationists hold to this model. He is a signer of A Scientific Dissent from Darwinism.

=== Huxley Memorial Debate ===
Andrews was invited by the Oxford Union Society to take part in the Huxley Memorial Debate on 16 February 1986, where he debated opposite Richard Dawkins on the motion 'That the doctrine of creation is more valid than the theory of evolution'. The proposer of the motion was A. E. Wilder-Smith. The opposers, Dawkins and John Maynard Smith, won the debate by 198 votes to 115.

== Publications ==
- 1963 – Chemistry and Physics of Rubberlike Substances – co-author. Editor: Leslie Bateman, then director of the Natural Rubber Producers' Research Association (where Andrews was a senior physicist), Welwyn Garden City, UK (London, Maclaren; New York, Wiley). ISBN 978-0853340607
- 1968 – Fracture in Polymers. A monograph.
- 1971 – The influence of morphology on the mechanical properties of crystalline polymers. Publication: London: Queen Mary College, Faculty of Engineering.
- 1971 – Deformation of Irradiated Single Crystals of Polyethylene – in collaboration with I. G. Voigt-Martin. Publication: London: Queen Mary College, Faculty of Engineering. Also published in the Proceedings of the Royal Society.
- 1971 – Solvent Stress Cracking and Crazing in Polymeric Glasses – Final Report (part 1 & 2 published in 1971, part 3 published in 1972) – co-authored with G. M. Levy and J. Willis. Publication: London: Queen Mary College, Faculty of Engineering.
- 1978 – Molecular Fracture in Polymers – co-author.
- 1979 – Developments in Polymer Fracture. ISBN 978-0853348191
- 1980 – God, Science and Evolution. [out of print]
- 1984 – Creationism in confusion? Correspondence letter in Nature. A response to this article: Evolution: Creationism in confusion
- 1989 – From Nothing to Nature – A Basic Guide to Evolution and Creation. Translated in ten languages (as at 2012). ISBN 978-0852341209
- 1994 – Christ and the Cosmos. ISBN 978-0852342206
- 1996 – Free in Christ, the message of Galatians. ISBN 978-0852343531
- 2003 – A Glorious High Throne, Hebrews Simply Explained. ISBN 978-0852345474
- 2009 – Who made God? Searching for a Theory of Everything. ISBN 978-0852347638
- 2018 - What is Man? Adam, alien or ape?. ISBN 978-1-595556844
