= Mark Nixon (academic) =

- Born: 4 May 1958 (age 68)
- Occupations: Author, researcher, editor and academic
- Awards: Fellow of the International Association of Pattern Recognition; BMVA Distinguished Fellow

Academic background
- Education: B.Sc., Cybernetics Science with Subsidiary Maths; Ph.D., Applied Estimation Theory
- Alma mater: University of Reading

Academic work
- Institutions: University of Southampton

Mark S. Nixon is an author, researcher, editor and an academic. He is currently the Editor-in-Chief of the IEEE Transactions on Biometrics, Behavior, and Identity Science (TBIOM). He is the former President of the IEEE Biometrics Council, and former vice-Chair of IEEE PSPB. He and Mayank Vatsa started the IEEE TBIOM whilst he was President. He retired from his position as Professor of Electronics and Computer Science at University of Southampton in 2019.

Nixon’s main research interests include using gait and ear as biometrics and using soft biometrics for identification. He has served the International Association for Pattern Recognition (IAPR) in several offices. Nixon has authored 5 books including Feature Extraction and Image Processing for Computer Vision, Human Identification based on Gait and Introductory Digital Design. He has nearly 30,000 citations.

Nixon became a BMVA Distinguished Fellow in 2015. He is a Fellow of the International Association of Pattern Recognition.

== Education ==
Nixon graduated from University of Reading in BSc Cybernetics Science with Subsidiary Mathematics in 1979. He completed his doctoral studies in Applied Estimation Theory from the same university in 1983.

== Academic career ==
Nixon joined the University of Southampton in 1983 and pursued his academic career in its School of Electronics and Computer Science. He became Professor in Computer Vision and later retired from his full-time academic position, becoming Professor Emeritus. His research and teaching at Southampton centered on image processing, computer vision and biometrics.

He has supervised more than 80 PhD and MPhil students to completion and has held management and research-related positions at Southampton, including responsibilities connected with recruitment and research evaluation.

Nixon has also served in leadership positions within the international computer vision and biometrics communities. He was President of the IEEE Biometrics Council in 2017–2018 and vice chair of the IEEE Publications Services and Products Board. He has served on committees of the International Association for Pattern Recognition (IAPR), including its Fellows Committee, and has been involved with its governing and technical committees. He has been the Chair/Program Co-Chair of many conferences including BMVC, ICPR, IEEE BTAS, IEEE ISBA, and IAPR/IEEE IJCB.

== Research ==
Nixon's research is centered on image processing, computer vision and the automatic analysis of human form and movement. His work has developed methods for extracting and describing static and moving shapes from images and video, with applications ranging from face and gait recognition to medical imaging. His research has increasingly focused on biometric identification from characteristics that can be observed at a distance, including gait, ear structure and descriptive human attributes.

=== Gait biometrics ===
A major strand of Nixon's research has been the development of gait recognition, which identifies individuals from characteristics of the way they walk. His Southampton group pioneered gait as a biometric modality, beginning with a paper presented at the 1997 International Conference on Audio- and Video-Based Biometric Person Authentication. Nixon subsequently co-authored the first book devoted to gait-based human identification, Human Identification Based on Gait (2005), with Tieniu Tan and Rama Chellappa. His work also included a survey of gait biometrics in the Proceedings of the IEEE, early workshops and special issues devoted to gait, and research into gait recognition from video and at a distance.

His research has examined both silhouette-based and model-based gait recognition, including the representation of human walking patterns in video and the use of gait where other biometric characteristics may be unavailable or obscured. Southampton's gait research has also addressed human identification at a distance and surveillance imagery. Nixon was principal investigator, with John Carter, on a DARPA-supported project on automatic gait recognition for the Human ID at a Distance programme.

Another component of this work concerns the analysis of movement itself. With Yan Sun and Jonathon Hare, Nixon investigated higher-order motion in image sequences, separating acceleration, jerk and other components from conventional velocity-based analysis. This work produced methods for identifying features of human movement, including rotational acceleration associated with a person's feet during walking, and explored the use of acceleration analysis for detecting violent behaviour. Related research introduced acceleration flow for detecting heel strikes in gait sequences and determining their spatial position from video.

=== Ear biometrics ===
Nixon has also contributed very early to the development of ear biometrics, in which the shape and structural characteristics of the ear are used for person recognition. His research examined the geometry of the ear and methods for automatically locating and normalising ear images. In 2010, Nixon, John Carter and Alastair Cummings reported an Image Ray Transform technique that highlighted tubular and curved structures in images, including the helix of the ear. The extracted structure could then be used in an ear-recognition system. Southampton identifies Nixon's group as an early contributor to ear biometrics and notes his 2005 work establishing the viability of the ear as a biometric.

Later research examined properties such as the distinctiveness and symmetry of ears, extending the analysis of ear structure as a source of biometric information. Nixon co-authored a 2021 study on distinctiveness and symmetry in ear biometrics with Di Meng and Sasan Mahmoodi.

=== Soft biometrics ===
A further major area of Nixon's research is soft biometrics, which uses descriptive attributes of a person's body, face or clothing for identification. Rather than depending exclusively on conventional biometric characteristics such as fingerprints or facial templates, soft biometrics seeks to represent information that people can describe verbally and that can also be extracted from images.

Nixon's work has focused particularly on the relationship between computer vision and human descriptions. His research seeks to bridge what he describes as the semantic gap between low-level image features and the attributes used by people when describing another person. This includes developing methods that can learn human descriptions from visual features and, conversely, use descriptions to identify or retrieve people from image databases.

His research has investigated descriptive attributes of the body, face and clothing, including comparative rather than merely categorical descriptions. Comparative descriptions allow one person to be described relative to another, providing information such as which of two people is taller, heavier or has particular visual characteristics. Nixon's work applied these methods to person identification and retrieval from surveillance imagery. Research on clothing extended the approach to automatically extracted semantic clothing attributes and examined their use for identification and re-identification when conventional biometric information is limited.

Crowdsourcing has also been incorporated into this research to obtain human descriptions from larger and more geographically diverse groups of observers. This has allowed the research to examine how consistently people perceive and describe visual attributes and how those descriptions can be incorporated into biometric recognition systems. His work in soft biometrics has also considered implications for eyewitness identification, because the attributes used by eyewitnesses to describe people can be represented computationally and compared with visual information.

Nixon's research has additionally addressed soft biometric fusion, combining multiple descriptive characteristics to improve identification at a distance. His work has included body, facial and clothing attributes and their integration for retrieval from surveillance imagery.

=== Shape analysis and computer vision ===
Underlying much of Nixon's research is the development of methods for shape extraction and description. His work includes both parametric and non-parametric approaches for extracting shapes from static images and video. These techniques have been applied to human recognition as well as medical imagery.

His earlier research in computer vision included automatic face recognition and feature extraction. He also developed approaches based on physical analogies for extracting structures from images, including applications to medical images. Examples include work on ultrasound imagery, blood-vessel branching and bone segmentation. His research has extended into three-dimensional image analysis and moving-object reconstruction.

=== Recent biometric research ===
Nixon has continued publishing on biometric recognition after his retirement from full-time academic employment. Recent work includes GaitASMS: gait recognition by adaptive structured spatial representation and multi-scale temporal aggregation and TriGait: hybrid fusion strategy for multimodal alignment and integration in gait recognition, both published in 2024. The latter examines multimodal alignment and fusion in gait recognition, while the former addresses spatial and temporal representation of gait patterns.

His recent work has also included the use of facial attractiveness as a soft biometric trait, the Human Identification at a Distance competition, and continued research on gait, ear biometrics and identity science. These studies extend his earlier work from individual biometric modalities toward combinations of visual characteristics, recognition systems and identity analysis.

Overall, Nixon's research has developed from early work in face recognition and image processing into a broader programme concerned with recognising and describing people from visual information, particularly through gait, ear structure and soft biometric attributes.

== Honors and awards ==
- Fellow of the International Association for Pattern Recognition (FIAPR), 2008, for services to biometrics and computer vision.
- British Machine Vision Association Distinguished Fellow, 2015.
- IEEE Biometrics Council Leadership Award, 2025, for leadership in research on gait and ear recognition, soft biometrics and service to the biometrics community.
- Notable Computer Book, Computing Reviews, 2012, for Feature Extraction and Image Processing for Computer Vision.
- Eliahu Jury Award, 2017.
- Best Paper and Student Awards at the International Society of Biomechanics Congress, 2003, for work involving his students.
- Best Paper Award at the 2015 International Conference on Computer Analysis of Images and Patterns.

== Bibliography ==
=== Books ===
- D'oh! Fourier: Theory, Applications, and Derivatives – 2021
- Introductory Digital Design – A Programmable Approach – 1995
- Feature Extraction and Image Processing for Computer Vision – 5th Edition, 2025
- Human identification based on gait, MS Nixon, T Tan, R Chellappa – 2005
- Digital Electronics: A Primer – 2015
- Handbook of Biometric Anti-Spoofing: Trusted Biometrics under Spoofing Attacks, Springer 2014

=== Selected articles ===
- D. Cunado, M. S. Nixon and J. N. Carter, Automatic Extraction and Description of Human Gait Models for Recognition Purposes, Computer Vision and Image Understanding, 90(1), pp. 1–41, 2003
- D. J. Hurley, M. S. Nixon and J. N. Carter, Force Field Feature Extraction for Ear Biometrics, Computer Vision and Image Understanding, 98(3), pp. 491–512, 2005
- D. Cunado, M. S. Nixon and J. N. Carter, Using Gait as a Biometric, via Phase-Weighted Magnitude Spectra, In: J Bigun, G. Chollet and G. Borgefors Eds.: Lecture Notes in Computer Science, 1206 (Proceedings of 1st Int. Conf. on Audio- and Video-Based Biometric Person Authentication AVBPA97), pp. 95–102, 1997
- J. D. Shutler, M. G. Grant, M. S. Nixon, and J. N. Carter, On a Large Sequence-Based Human Gait Database, A. Lotfi, J. M. Garibaldi Eds., Applications in Science and Soft Computing, Springer, pp. 339–346, 2003
- M. S. Nixon, J. N. Carter, M. G. Grant, L. G. Gordon and J. B. Hayfron-Acquah, Automatic Recognition by Gait: Progress and Prospects, Sensor Review, 23(4), 323–331, 2003
- S. R. Gunn and M. S. Nixon, A Robust Snake Implementation; A Dual Active Contour, IEEE Transactions on Pattern Analysis and Machine Intelligence, 19(1), pp. 63–67, 1997
- S. V. Stevenage, M. S. Nixon and K. Vince, Visual Analysis of Gait as a Cue to Identity, Applied Cognitive Psychology, 13(6), pp. 513–526, 1999
- D. K. Wagg and M. S. Nixon, On Automated Model-Based Extraction and Analysis of Gait, IEEE Face and Gesture Analysis ‘04, Seoul (Korea), pp. 11–16, 2004
- A. J. Tatem, H. G. Lewis, P. Atkinson and M. S. Nixon, Super-Resolution Land Cover Pattern Prediction using a Hopfield Neural Network, Remote Sensing of Environment, 79(1), pp. 1–14, 2002
- J. B. Hayfron-Acquah, M. S. Nixon and J. N. Carter Automatic Gait Recognition by Symmetry Analysis, Pattern Recognition Letters, 24(13), 2175–2183, 2003 (Invited from AVBPA 2001)
- P. S. Huang, C. J. Harris and M. S. Nixon, Recognising Humans by Gait via Parametric Canonical Space, Proc. International ICSC Workshop on Engineering of Intelligent Systems EIS’98, 3, pp. 384–389, 1998
- P. S. Huang, C. J. Harris and M. S. Nixon, Human Gait Recognition in Canonical Space using Temporal Templates, IEE Proceedings Vision Image and Signal Processing, 146(2), pp. 93–100, 1999
