= Commonwealth Local Government Forum =

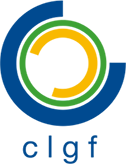
- Logo
- Abbreviation: CLGF
- Founded: 1995; 31 years ago
- Type: Intergovernmental organisation
- Headquarters: London, United Kingdom
- Parent organisation: The Commonwealth
- Website: www.clgf.org.uk

The Commonwealth Local Government Forum (CLGF) is a global local government organisation, bringing together local authorities, their national associations and the ministries responsible for local government in the member countries of the Commonwealth. CLGF works with national and local governments to support the development of democratic values and good local governance and is the associated organisation officially recognised by Commonwealth Heads of Government as the representative body for local government in the Commonwealth.

CLGF is unique in bringing together central, provincial and local spheres of government involved in local government policy and decision-making. CLGF members include local government associations, individual local authorities, ministries dealing with local government, and research and professional organisations who work with local government. Practitioner to practitioner support is at the core of CLGF's work across the Commonwealth and within the region, using CLGF's own members to support others both within and between regions.

The Commonwealth Journal of Local Governance exists with the support of the Commonwealth Local Government Forum.

== History ==
CLGF was founded in 1995 and its establishment was endorsed by Commonwealth Heads of Government at their meeting in New Zealand later that year. It has received further endorsement at subsequent Commonwealth Heads of Government Meetings and in 2003 was given official recognition as an associated Commonwealth organisation of elected representatives. At the 2005 Commonwealth Local Government Conference held in Aberdeen, the members of CLGF endorsed the Aberdeen Agenda: Commonwealth principles for local democracy and good governance which we're endorsed later that year by the Commonwealth Heads of Government Meeting held in Malta, and in 2013 incorporated in the Charter of the Commonwealth.

In 2025 the Forum celebrated its 30th anniversary by profiling thirty of its members. Esther Sagawa from Malawi was chosen together with 29 others.

== Partnerships ==
CLGF works closely with other Commonwealth and international organisations such as the Commonwealth Secretariat, the Commonwealth Foundation, the Commonwealth Parliamentary Association and the United Nations, including UN-Habitat and the United Nations Development Programme (UNDP), to promote and support democratic local government in the Commonwealth and to ensure that local government is recognised as an important sphere of government in development. CLGF is a member of the Global Taskforce of Local and Regional Governments along with other global local government organisations including UCLG, UNACLA, ICLEI, IAFM, ATO, and C40 and is also a member of Cities Alliance.

The Commonwealth Journal of Local Governance is written under the auspices of CLGF, edited by Cardiff University and published by the University of Technology Sydney. It was first published in 2008.

== Organisation ==
The CLGF secretariat is housed in the Commonwealth hub on Pall Mall, London and has regional offices in the Caribbean, West Africa, Southern Africa, South Asia and the Pacific, and country programme offices in Sri Lanka and Zimbabwe. The current Chair of CLGF is Cllr. Mpho Moruakgomo, President of BALA and Secretary-General is Dr Greg Munro, who took over from the founding Secretary-General Dr Carl Wright in 2016. CLGF patrons include former UNDP Administrator and New Zealand Prime Minister Rt Hon. Helen Clark and Tuvaluan Prime Minister Enele Sopoaga.

== Commonwealth Local Government Conferences ==
CLGF organised pan-Commonwealth biennial conference bringing together is members and partners

Four conferences were held 2011-17: In November 2017 in Valletta, Malta on the theme of 'Fit for the future: resources and capacity for effective local government'. In Gaborone in June 2015 on the theme 'Local government 2030: achieving the vision' and CLGF general assembly endorsed the Gaborone Declaration - Local Government 2030. 2013 in Kampala. 2011 in Cardiff. The next conference is to be held in Kigali, Rwanda in late 2023.
