= David Hull (paediatrician) =

British paediatrician (1932–2021)

Professor Sir David Hull FRCP FRCPCH
- Born: 4 August 1932; Blackburn, Lancashire, England
- Died: 13 March 2021 (aged 88)
- Education: Liverpool University
- Known for: Research into brown fat
- Awards: FRCP, FRCPCH, James Spence Medal in 1996
- Scientific career
- Fields: Paediatrics
- Workplaces: University of Oxford

Sir David Hull (4 August 1932 – 13 March 2021) was a British paediatrician. Hull was most notable for research and for a paper he published in 1963 in the Journal of Physiology with Michael Dawkins, about research into brown fat, an adipose-like tissue found in hibernating animals and in the human Infant and for later contributions considered outstanding in research conducted on Lipid metabolism and Thermoregulation.

== Early life and education ==
Hull was born in Blackburn, Lancashire, the second son of William Hull and Nellie Hayes. He has a brother, Derek Hull (born 8 August 1931), almost exactly one year older. He attended Poulton-le-Fylde grammar school, before graduating from Liverpool University. He then spent two years in the Royal Army Medical Corps, most of which time was spent at the British Military Hospital in Berlin.

== Career ==
On his return, he underwent further medical training in London, and then obtained a post as Nuffield Research Fellow at the Institute for Medical Research in Oxford., and then as lecturer in Paediatrics, at the University of Oxford from 1963, after which he was appointed in 1966 as Consultant Paediatrician, at the Great Ormond Street Hospital for Sick Children. In 1972 he became Foundation Professor of Child Health at the University of Nottingham, where he worked until 1996.

He served as president of the Neonatal Society from 1987 until 1991, as president of the British Paediatric Association from 1991 to 1994, and as an adviser on paediatrics to the Government Chief Scientist. He received the Royal College of Paediatrics and Child Health's James Spence Medal in 1996, "due to his contributions to a host of organisations and working parties concerned with the health of children". He was made a Knight Bachelor in the 1993 New Year Honours, for his work in the field of childcare.

In 2005 he was a character witness in the General Medical Council hearing into the conduct of Sir Roy Meadow.

He died on 13 March 2021 at the age of 88 from complications of Parkinson's disease.

== Awards and honours ==
- Knight Bachelor in 1993.
- James Spence Medal in 1996.
