= Nicola Pugno =

Italian materials scientist (born 1972)

Nicola Maria Pugno (born 4 January 1972) is an Italian mechanician, structural and materials scientist, mechanical engineer and physicist, holding PhDs in fracture mechanics and in biology. He is a full professor of solid and structural mechanics at the University of Trento, founder of the Mechano-X Labs (previously at the Polytechnic University of Turin, founder of the Laboratory of Bio-inspired Nanomechanics "Giuseppe Maria Pugno") and part-time professor of materials science at Queen Mary University of London. He is also Academic Visitor at the University of Oxford.

He has been appointed to several advisory and scientific committees, including the technical and scientific committee of the Italian Space Agency, and has served as a plenary speaker at various international workshops, events and conferences, including Falling Walls, the World Economic Forum and the European Parliament, invited by the European Research Council (ERC), as well as the opening plenary speaker at the International Conference of Theoretical and Applied Mechanics (2020+1). He is an editorial board member of several international journals and has been appointed as the first field chief editor of Frontiers in Materials (IF 3.5).

Pugno has published a multitude of papers in international journals. For his scientific contributions in nanomechanics, bioinspiration, fracture mechanics and adhesion (e.g., proposals for high-strength (hierarchical) bio-inspired materials, high-toughness (knotted) fibers, high-strength nanotube/graphene cables (and composites), "bionicomposites" such as spider silk spun by spiders fed with nanomaterials, bio-inspired (hierarchical) metamaterials, tunable friction surfaces, superadhesive or antiadhesive (e.g., anti-ice) surfaces, nanoelectromechanical systems modelling, multiple peeling theories, Quantized/Finite Fracture Mechanics, etc.), he has received several awards. These include the first edition of the GiovedìScienza Prize in 2012 (for both research and science popularization), the A. A. Griffith Medal and Prize (IOM3) in 2017, the Humboldt Research Award (Alexander von Humboldt Foundation) in 2022 and The Modesto Panetti and Carlo Ferrari International Prize and Gold Medal (Academy of Sciences of Turin) in 2026. Since 2011, he has been awarded several grants from the European Union, mainly within the Excellent Science pillar — including ERC grants — for both fundamental science and high-tech transfer, which he is developing for applications in various high-tech industries.
