= Kondwa Sakala-Chibiya =

Zambian lawyer

Vice-Chairperson of the Judicial Service Commission of Zambia
- President: Hakainde Hichilema

Vice-Chairperson of the Human Rights Commission of Zambia
- Incumbent
- Assumed office 2016

President of the SADC Lawyers Association

Managing Partner, J.B. Sakala Legal Practitioners

Personal details
- Born: Kondwa Emily Sakala-Chibiya
- Occupation: Lawyer
- Profession: Lawyer
- Known for: Human rights and legal advocacy

Kondwa Sakala-Chibiya is a Zambian lawyer and Vice Chair for the Human Rights Commission, and former President of SADC Lawyers Association. She earned a Bachelor of Laws (LLB) from the University of Reading. She is a board member of the Centre for Infectious Disease Research in Zambia, and currently serves as of the Judicial Service Commission, following her appointment by Hakainde Hichilema. In 2024, she was awarded the title of State Counsel, an honor denoting elevation to Zambia's Inner Bar. She is Managing Partner of the Zambian law firm J.B. Sakala & Co.
