= Biblical Creation Society =

- Formation: 1977
- Type: Religious ministry
- Headquarters: Rugby, Warwickshire, United Kingdom
- Website: biblicalcreation.org.uk

The Biblical Creation Society (BCS) is a United Kingdom-based creationist organisation founded in 1977 by Scottish minister Nigel M. de S. Cameron (now President of the Center for Policy on Emerging Technologies and a group of evangelical students, who were concerned about the popularity of theistic evolution among conservative Christians, but were repelled by the "wholly negative" attitude of the Evolution Protest Movement. Although inspired by the scientific creationism of John C. Whitcomb and Henry M. Morris (authors of The Genesis Flood), it refused to limit its membership to only Young Earth creationists, and in its name rejected American attempts to separate scientific creationism from its Biblical roots (a separation rendered unnecessary by the lack of constitutional barriers to teaching creationism in the United Kingdom). The organisation is based in Rugby, Warwickshire.

== Overview ==
The Society's formal doctrinal basis is the same as that of Universities and Colleges Christian Fellowship (UCCF). However, it has published a manifesto setting out further teachings about creation which the society holds as essential to be faithful to the Bible.

The Society's website states that it offers "a range of articles on very diverse subjects – but all seeking to show that the Bible provides a solid foundation not only for our understanding of origins but also for every aspect of life." The BCS publishes a journal, Origins (formerly Biblical Creation), two or three times a year.

The British Centre for Science Education, which opposes the teaching of creationism in UK schools, acknowledges that the Biblical Creation Society "appears to be the second largest of the UK's dedicated creationist organisations" and "has some very highly educated members and associates".

== Prominent members ==
Its first president was Edgar H. Andrews, Emeritus Professor of Materials at Queen Mary, University of London, where he was a long-serving head of department and later Dean of Engineering. He is described by historian of creationism Ronald Numbers as the United Kingdom's "most respected creationist scientist of the late twentieth century", a Reformed Baptist, and a convert to Whitcomb and Morris' flood geology since the 1960s. However, he rejected some elements of their views, particularly dogmatic acceptance of a young Earth (even going so far as to suggest that the first day of creation "might be of indefinite length").

Another prominent member, David C. Watts (Professor of Biomaterials Science at the University of Manchester), went even further in diverging from the American view, described giving primacy to the question of the age of the Earth a "great mistake" and admitted the possibility that life existed before the Edenic creation. His views slowly moved to progressive creationism.

== Debates on the creation–evolution controversy ==
The Society or its officers have been invited to represent the creationist case when the Creation–evolution controversy is debated in the UK. In 1986 the Society's President, Edgar Andrews, represented the BCS in a debate at the Oxford Union, seconded by A. E. Wilder-Smith. Their proposition was "That the Doctrine of Creation is more valid than the Theory of Evolution". They lost the debate, to Richard Dawkins and John Maynard Smith who opposed this proposition, by 198 to 115 votes.

David Tyler represented the Society in a live television debate with journalist Francis Beckett on BBC Breakfast, on the teaching of intelligent design in school science lessons, in February 2005.

== Disagreements with other Christian groups ==
The Society has supported conferences organised by evangelical churches. However, not all evangelicals or Christians agree with their position. Some members of the Research Scientists' Christian Fellowship (who do not individually or collectively identify themselves as "creationist" but which, as one of the professional groups of the UCCF, held to the same Doctrinal Basis as the BCS) met with members of the BCS to identify their points of disagreement. This meeting resulted in the publication of eight questions to the BCS on the application of Biblical authority to the question of evolution.

In 2006 the prominent creationist group Answers in Genesis posted a page disputing the 'Recolonisation Theory' and accusing its supporters of "compromis[ing] on the truth of Scripture". The Committee of the BCS responded stating that the accusation was against "several members of BCS (who are also contributors to Origins)", that BCS "do[es] not take a collective position on the Recolonisation Model", but that labelling them as "compromisers" was unjustified, and that placing it "alongside 'articles on compromises of Scripture such as the Gap Theory, the Framework Hypothesis, Theistic Evolution and Progressive Creation' is totally unwarranted."

== People associated with the society ==
Current officers or employees of the Society include:

- Travelling Secretary: J. H. John Peet FRSC
- Secretary: David J. Tyler, Senior Lecturer in the Department of Clothing Design and Technology at Manchester Metropolitan University
- Paul Garner, also associated with Biblical Creation Ministries, a separate charity launched by the BCS in 2002
