= Amanda Petford-Long =

British materials scientist

Amanda Petford-Long FREng
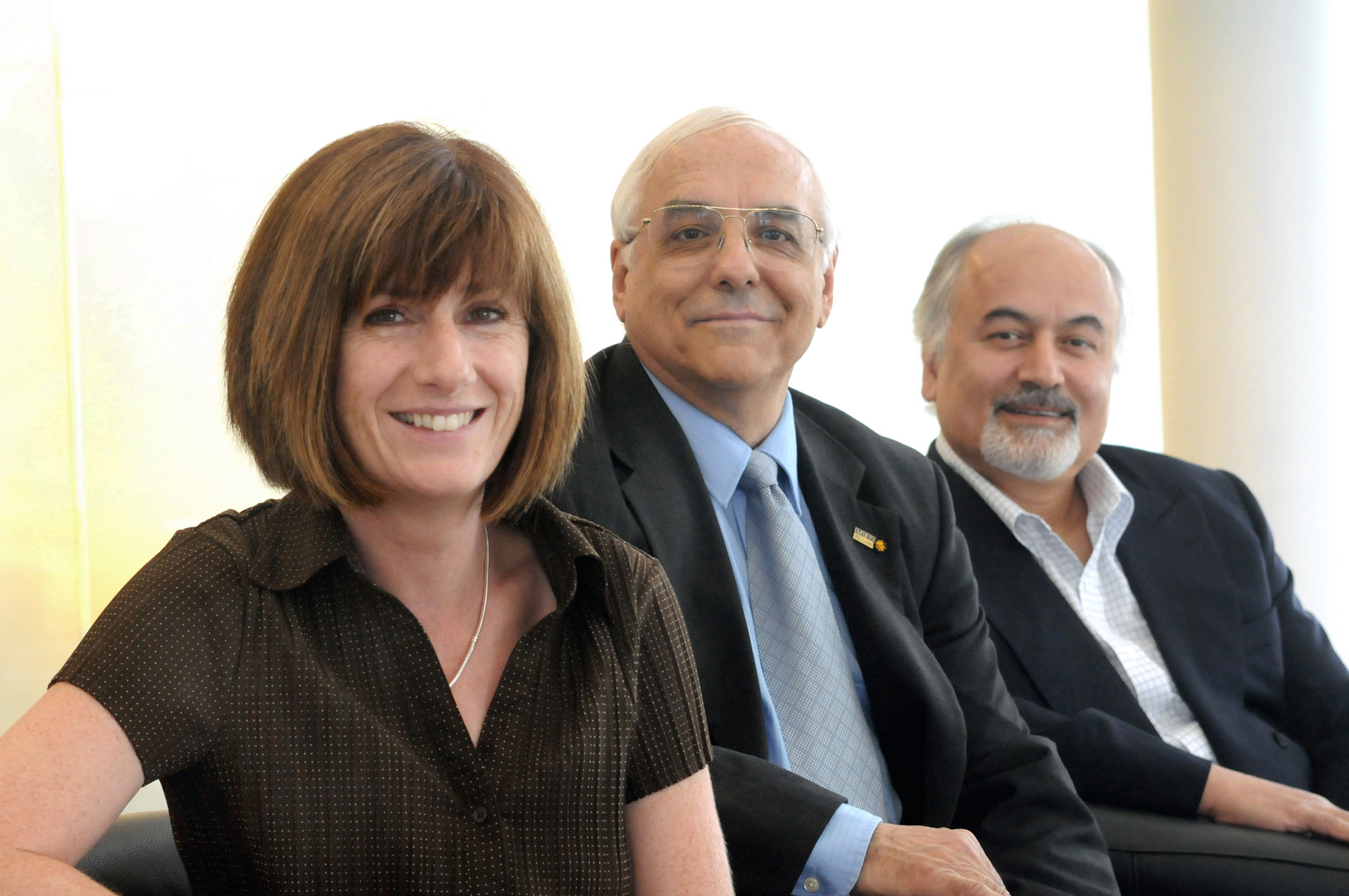
- Born: Amanda Karen Petford
- Education: University College London (BSc); University of Oxford (DPhil)
- Scientific career
- Workplaces: Northwestern University; Argonne National Lab; Arizona State University
- Thesis: Structural studies of various β-aluminas (1984)
- Doctoral advisor: Colin Humphreys
- Website: www.anl.gov/profile/amanda-k-petford-long

Amanda Karen Petford-Long FREng is a Professor of Materials Science and Distinguished Fellow at the Argonne National Laboratory. She is also a Professor of Materials Science at Northwestern University.

== Education and early career ==
Petford-Long studied physics at University College London, graduating in 1981. She earned a Doctor of Philosophy degree from the University of Oxford in 1985 for research on Beta-alumina solid electrolytes supervised by Colin Humphreys. She was a postgraduate student at St. Cross College, Oxford.

== Career and research ==
Petford-Long served as professor at Corpus Christi College, Oxford, from 2002. She worked on spray coated nanocomposite materials and magnetic nanoparticles and used an atom probe. She was the only woman to be elected a Fellow of the Royal Academy of Engineering (FREng) in 2005. Petford-Long moved to Argonne National Laboratory in 2005.

She served as director of the Center for Nanoscale Materials from 2010 to 2014, developing new techniques for nanoscale characterisation. She delivered a lecture for the Chicago Council on Science and Technology in 2014.

She has explored the microstructure and magnetic field properties in multiferroic tunnel junctions. She works with Jacqueline Johnson on fluorozirconate glass for novel ceramics, using pulsed laser deposition to fabricate thin films. She has demonstrated that nanoparticle crystallisation impacts the optical properties of the glass ceramics. Pulsed laser deposition allows her to control the distribution of europium dopants and the nanocrystalline phase behaviour. The applications include up and down-converters for solar cells. She discussed their work on NPR in 2018.

Petford-Long develops in situ magnetised transmission electron microscopy (TEM) methods for examining magnetic thin film structures. She uses Lorentz transmission electron microscopy to identify the micromagnetic behaviour. She created skyrmions, chiral spin structures with no net charge. They used an ion-beam, allowing them to make skyrmion-like structures at a variety of length scales. She showed that non-repeating patterns in quasicrystals could be used to store information.

She serves as chair of the American Physical Society Division of Materials Physics from 2018 to 2019. She serves on the scientific advisory board of the Centre for Research on Adaptive Nanostructures and Nanodevices at Trinity College Dublin. She is Chair of the Argonne National Laboratory Chief Research Officer Council. She is an advocate for women in engineering and has been involved in initiatives to inspire young girls to choose engineering at college.

=== Awards and honors ===
Petford-Long is a Fellow of the American Physical Society, the Royal Microscopical Society and the Royal Academy of Engineering. She was elected a Distinguished Fellow at Argonne National Laboratoryin 2010.
