= A. A. Griffith Medal and Prize =

Award by the Institute of Materials, Minerals and Mining

The A. A. Griffith Medal and Prize was awarded annually from 1965 to 2021 by the Institute of Materials, Minerals and Mining in commemoration of Alan Arnold Griffith.

== History ==
The award was established by the Materials Science Club of Great Britain in 1965, two years after its formation in 1963. Modern materials science as an integrated discipline (as distinct from single-material studies such as metallurgy) was in its infancy, and the Materials Science Club was a 'gathering place' for this new field of applied science. In 1985 it was merged into the Institute of Metals, which in turn became part of the Institute of Materials, Minerals and Mining.

== Award ==
The A. A. Griffith Medal and Prize was given in recognition of distinguished work that has made or is making a notable contribution to any branch of materials science. The prize value was £300.

== Recipients of awards for personal achievement since 1965 ==
- 1965 – Sir Alan Cottrell
- 1966 – J. E. Gordon
- 1967 – Professor Charles Frank
- 1968 – Professor David Tabor
- 1969 – Sir Geoffrey Taylor
- 1970 – Sir Hugh Ford
- 1971 – J. W. White
- 1972 – L. R. G. Treloar
- 1973 – Sir Nevill Mott
- 1974 – Professor Anthony Kelly
- 1975 – Sir Monty Finniston
- 1976 – J. H. Chesters
- 1977 – Professor Edgar H. Andrews

Andrews established the Department of Materials at Queen Mary College, the first such department in the UK to treat varied materials (including metals, polymers, ceramics and composites) in a unified manner. (There was an earlier department of materials science at Bangor University School of Electronic Engineering, but that department was devoted exclusively to electrical/electronic materials.)

- 1978 – Sir Alastair Pilkington
- 1979 – Sir Peter Hirsch
- 1980 – J. T. Scales
- 1981 – Professor Michael F. Ashby
- 1982 – Professor Ian Ward
- 1983 – Professor Robert W. Cahn
- 1984 – Professor W. C. Wake
- 1985 – Professor Derek Hull
- 1986 – Nicholas J. Phillips
- 1987 – E. D. Hondros
- 1988 – Professor M. J. Bevis
- 1989 – Professor K. H. Jack
- 1990 – Professor P. L. Pratt
- 1991 – Professor William Bonfield
- 1992 – D. V. Wilson
- 1993 – C. Gurney [Henry Charles Horton Gurney, OBE], known as Charles Gurney
- 1994 – Professor Anthony G. Evans
- 1995 – G. W. Greenwood
- 1996 – Professor A. J. Kinloch
- 1997 – G. C. Wood
- 1998 – Dr. J. Johnson
- 1999 – Professor John F. Knott
- 2000 – Professor R. C. Pond
- 2001 – Professor Colin John Humphreys
- 2002 – Professor R. J. Young
- 2003 – R. W. Whatmore
- 2004 – Professor T. W. Clyne
- 2005 – Professor D. J. Bacon
- 2006 – Dr. P. S. Bate, University of Manchester, for his many papers covering the development of crystallographic texture
- 2007 – Professor R. O. Ritchie
- 2008 – Professor Neil Alford FREng FIMMM, of Imperial College London and professor Anthony R. West (joint winners).

Alford is noted for commercial exploitation of research into structural and electronic materials. He is currently investigating third and fourth generation communications systems tuneable filters. West has progressed energy storage and electro-ceramic devices by exploring the synthesis and characterisation of inorganic materials.

- 2009 – Professor A. Lindsay Greer, Head of the Department of Materials Science and Metallurgy at the University of Cambridge.

Greer is renowned for his work on metallic glasses and nucleation, particularly of crystalline phases from liquids and gases. He invented the free-growth model paradigm for the analysis of heterogeneous nucleation. This has been successfully applied to the analysis of grain refinement in aluminium casting.

- 2010 – Professor Robin Grimes FIMMM, of Imperial College London, for work in nuclear engineering.

He spent time abroad at the Los Alamos National Laboratory in the USA while holding a post as Reader in Atomistic Simulation at Imperial's Department of Materials Science. He balances his academic commitments of leading the EPSRC consortium on nuclear and Director of Imperial's Centre for Nuclear Engineering with media appearances in support of nuclear energy.

- 2011 – Professor David Hayhurst FREng FIMMM from the School of Mechanical, Aerospace and Civil Engineering at the University of Manchester.

He is renowned for his understanding of the mechanics of materials, and for pioneering techniques that led to the study of computational continuum damage mechanics (CDM) being recognised in its own right. Current thinking stated that computational CDM methods were not advanced enough to predict weld lifetimes, but Hayhurst showed that it could be applied to welded pressurised pipes. This work on CDM has been applied to multi-axial stress states and notched bars.

- 2012 – Professor Molly Stevens of Imperial College London, for her outstanding contribution to the field of biomaterials.

Her research focuses on developing novel biomaterials for human health. Her nano-materials for biosensing have enabled the most sensitive facile enzyme detection to date and she is actively pursuing these having received the Royal Society's Brian Mercer Award to facilitate commercialisation. Professor Stevens' previous awards are testament to her multidisciplinary research. These include the Polymer International IUPAC Award for Creativity in Polymer Science or Polymer Technology and the Guardian's top 100 inspirational women. Stevens has made consistently significant contributions to science and holds many events for young people in her lab, including the London International Youth Science Forum.

- 2013 – Dr. Robert Broomfield CEng FIMMM, in recognition of distinguished work which has made or is making a notable contribution to any branch of materials science.

Broomfield has made considerable contributions to the development and service implementation of aero-engine materials over a 27-year period at Rolls-Royce, and during a prior seven-year role at Imperial Metal Industries (IMI) in Birmingham. Bob worked at Rolls-Royce from 1979 on titanium alloys, moving onto hot section materials such as nickel superalloys and ceramics, and holding various managerial positions. In 1990, he decided to move away from the managerial route and pursued technical specialism, becoming Rolls-Royce’s UK specialist in turbine aerofoil materials, where he stayed until his retirement in 2006. During his time as a specialist, he introduced the second generation single crystal alloy CMSX4 to Rolls-Royce and worked with Cannon-Muskegon to define and introduce the third generation single crystal alloys RR3000 and RR3010. His significant work in the field of aero-engine materials, demonstrated by the use of two generations of single crystal nickel superalloys in turbine blades, has permitted Rolls-Royce to make dramatic improvements in turbine entry temperature, and therefore, specific fuel consumption. He is widely acknowledged and respected as a world expert in this field by his colleagues, co-workers in the supply chain and in academia.

- 2014 – Professor Norman Fleck FRS FREng FIMMM, an internationally recognised leader in the area of mechanical properties of materials for many years.

Norman has made seminal contributions in many areas of fatigue and fracture in metals, foams and composites. He co-developed a theory of kink-band formation in composites, was a major developer of the concept of strain-gradient plasticity, and has made extensive contributions to the mechanics of metal foams and sandwich structures. He pioneered the use and analysis of truss-like structures in sandwich specimens for blast protection. His work is always characterised by rigorous analysis, elegant experiments, and clear exposition.

- 2015 – Professor Ivan Parkin
- 2016 – Professor Yiu Wing Mai
- 2017 – Professor Nicola Pugno, of University of Trento and Queen Mary University of London.

For his pioneering works in carbon nanotubes, graphene, bio-inspired materials, such as gecko-inspired super adhesive surfaces, lotus leaf-inspired super-hydrophobicity and self-cleaning surfaces, limpet teeth-inspired super-strong materials, spider silk-inspired super-tough materials and bone-inspired self-healing materials. Pugno has developed the toughest fibers reaching 1400J/g and has discovered the strongest biological material. He has developed new theories such as Quantized Fracture Mechanics, an extension of the celebrated Linear Elastic Fracture Mechanics of Griffith, from where he has removed the hypothesis of the continuous crack growth, in order to treat any defect size and shape and thus also the fracture of nanoscale objects. The theory has been further extended in fatigue and dynamic fracture. Another theory he has developed is that of multiple peeling, whereas before only single peeling problems were tractable. Peeling has a huge implication in understanding different topics from mechanics of composites to biological adhesion. He has received European Research Council (ERC) grants to support technology transfer of his work into commercial applications and he is currently working with several high tech industries developing new markets for several different new materials. He also introduced the new concept of Bionicomposites, demonstrating that feeding spiders with graphene or nanotubes results in their spinning of a bionic silk, incorporating the nanomaterials, with superior structural characteristics.

- 2018 – Ruth Cameron
- 2019 – David Jones
- 2020 – Manish Chhowalla
- 2021 – Magdalena Titirici (this is the end of the list, since 2021 the award is no longer given)

== Sources ==
- List provided by IOM3
