= Robert Hutton (metallurgist) =

British metallurgist (1876–1970)

- Born: 1876
- Died: 5 August 1970 (aged 93–94)
- Occupations: Metallurgist, professor

Robert Hutton (1876 – 5 August 1970) was an English metallurgist and Goldsmiths’ Professor in Metallurgy at Cambridge University from 1931 to 1942 and known for his work with the Society for the Protection of Science and Learning in assisting academics to flee the Nazi regime in Germany.

== Early life ==
Robert Salmon Hutton was the son of J.B Hutton, a member of an old, well-known firm of silver table-ware manufacturers in Sheffield. Hutton spent his early life in London apart from the time he was at Blundell's School in Tiverton. From school he went to Owens College in Manchester, followed by two years at the University of Leipzig and one in Paris.

== Career ==
Hutton was appointed lecturer in electro-metallurgy at Manchester University in 1900, but in 1908 moved to Sheffield where he entered the family business. In 1921 he was invited to become director of the British Non-Ferrous Metals Research Association. The Association expanded and achieved a world-wide reputation under his guidance. He was one of the original members of the Institute of Metals and a member of Council from 1909 to 1935.

Hutton became the first Goldsmiths’ Professor in Metallurgy at Cambridge University in 1931. Although some of the pioneer work in metallography had been carried out by Heycock and Neville in the University Chemical Laboratory and formed part of the course in assaying chemistry, metallurgy was not included as a separate subject in the Natural Sciences Tripos. The Goldsmiths’ Company had generously provided funds for a small laboratory and endowed a chair, but it was Hutton who first persuaded the university to introduce metallurgy into Part II of the Natural Sciences Tripos and later Part I.

Hutton was elected a Fellow of Clare College and became a member of the Court of the Goldsmiths’ Company in 1936.

Hutton's activities were not confined to those directly concerned with his various appointments. He had two absorbing interests: technical education and libraries. His experience in the field of metallurgy led him to the conclusion that there was a sad delay between scientific advance and its application in industry, for which he blamed technical education, or rather lack of it. His practical interest was shown in the work which he did for the City and Guilds of London Institute of which he was Chairman of Council from 1939 to 1948. He was largely instrumental in starting the Association of Special Libraries and Information Bureaux (ASLIB) and was its president from 1942 to 1944.

In 1912 Hutton married Sibyl, daughter of Sir Arthur Schuster, F.R.S., by whom be had a son and a daughter.

== Society for the Protection of Science and Learning ==
Hutton was on the committee of the Society for the Protection of Science and Learning from the date of its move to Cambridge at the outbreak of World War II and for 30 years never missed a meeting. For many years he was the honorary secretary and later honorary treasurer and was responsible for most of the work involved when the Society became a registered charity in 1959.

From 1933 Hutton went to Germany several times to negotiate the release of scientists and scholars from Nazi persecution and he served on the Society's allocation committee from 1939.

Incidentally, one of the founders of the Society, A. V. Hill, was a fellow Old Blundellian.

== Research and publications ==
Hutton published work in the Philosophical Transactions of the Royal Society, Transactions of the Faraday Society, and the Institute of Metals, contributing the Autumn Lecture to the Institute of Metals in 1922, on the "Science of Human Effort".

Hutton took part in discussions on a number of papers of general metallurgical interest, and was an authority on refractories and furnace construction. He was one of those responsible for starting Research, a journal devoted to making scientific advance known to a wider public and to bridging the gap between pure science and its application to industry. He was secretary to the scientific advisory board of the journal.

== Sources ==
- Letter from Professor W. Feldberg, The Times, 18 August 1970 (pg. 8; Issue 57947; col F)
- Robert Hutton papers at John Rylands Library, Manchester.
- The Papers of Professor Robert S. Hutton held at Churchill Archives Centre
