= Carl Wright (civil servant) =

British civil servant (born 1950)

- Born: 18 February 1950 (age 76)
- Education: University College London; University of Reading
- Employer: Commonwealth Local Government Forum
- Successor: Dr Greg Munro
- Honours: Doctor of Administration (honoris causa), University of KwaZulu-Natal, Durban, 2013

Carl W. Wright (born 18 February 1950) is a Commonwealth civil servant, former director of the Commonwealth Trade Union Group (1980–1994) and Secretary-General of the Commonwealth Local Government Forum (1994–2016). Author 'Global Citizen: Grass Roots Activism and High Diplomacy' (Hansib Publication 2022)

== Education ==
Wright spent his childhood in Tenby, Wales, and studied European Politics at the University of Reading, and Regional Economic and Urban Planning at the University College London. While at the latter, Wright became Chair of the London University Europe Club, and in 1971-72 Co-chair (with Julian Priestley) of the UK-wide Students for a United Europe, just as Britain's negotiations to join the European Communities were at a crucial point.

== Early career ==
In 1973, Wright joined the European Commission as adviser to Commissioner George Thomson, as one of the first Britons to work for the Commission and Secretary of the International Confederation of Free Trade Unions (1974–80).

== Commonwealth career ==
From 1980 to 1988 he was the founding Director of the Commonwealth Trade Union Group (at that time called the Commonwealth Trade Union Council), which campaigned for human and labour rights, and Assistant Director at the Commonwealth Secretariat (198894) where he dealt with Commonwealth programmes for South Africa, Namibia and Mozambique. In 1994 he became the founding director of the Commonwealth Local Government Forum and its Secretary-General from 1995 to 2016. One key achievement during this time was the adoption of the Aberdeen Agenda: Commonwealth Principles on Good Practice for Local Democracy and Good Governance which guides the Commonwealth advocacy and engagement on local democracy and was incorporated into the Commonwealth Charter in 2013. Wright has been a member of the Global Taskforce of Local and Regional Government on Post-2015 and Habitat III representing global local government organisations at the Addis Ababa Conference on Financing for Development and COP21 Paris and chaired key UN consultations on 2030 Agenda for Sustainable Development (2013–16).

In 2016 he joined the board of trustees of the UN Association UK, the Ramphal Institute and editorial board of The Round Table journal.

For his work in "international co-operation" and other areas, Wright received an honorary doctorate in Administration from the University of KwaZulu-Natal in 2013.

Wright published his biographical memoir 'Global Citizen Grass Roots Activism and High Diplomacy: Recollections 1972-2022' with Hansib Publications in 2022
