= The Flowolf =

Nigerian Musician

- Born: Folarinwale Elemide; 19 October 1994 (age 31)
- Origin: Oyo State, Nigeria
- Genre: Afrobeats
- Occupations: Rapper; singer; songwriter
- Instrument: Vocals
- Years active: 2018–present
- Label: Nubian Entertainment • DMW (Affiliate)

Folarinwale Elemide (born 19 October 1994), known professionally as The Flowolf, is a Nigerian rapper and singer-songwriter. He rose to prominence in 2020 with the release of the viral song 'Mafa Mafa' featuring Davido, Peruzzi, and Dremo, that peaked at number two on the Nigeria Apple Music chart on the week of April 5, 2020. Elemide is affiliated with Davido Music Worldwide.

== Early life and education ==
Folarinwale Elemide was born in Lagos State, Nigeria, where he grew up to pursued his secondary education before moving to the United Kingdom for further studies. He studied Business Administration at the University of Reading, and his musical career began in his childhood when he joined a local church choir. While he was in school he and some friends formed a music group and they performed at their school's prize-giving day and on other special occasions.

== Career ==
He began his professional music career in 2015 when he was signed to Ocho Records. In 2017, The Flowolf released his debut single 'Playback' which featured Davido and Dremo. In 2019, he released his hit single 'No Shaking' which featured Mayorkun and Peruzzi. In 2020, under Davido Music Worldwide, he dropped a collaborate single 'Mafa Mafa' that featured Davido, Peruzzi, and Dremo. The song went viral and as a result of the Mafa Mafa Dancing Challenge, the song peaked at number two on the Nigeria Apple Music chart on the week of April 5, 2020. He released other notable singles, including 'Bobo', 'You Are Cancelled', 'Fifa' and 'Blood Hot'.

== Discography ==
=== EP ===
Full Moon (2021)

=== Singles ===
- "Playback" feat. Davido and Dremo
- "Desperado" (2017)
- "No Shaking" feat. Mayorkun and Peruzzi (2019)
- "Trigger" (2019)
- "On A Jay" feat. Mayorkun and Dremo (2020)
- "FIFA" (2020)
- "Bobo" (2020)
- "Mafa Mafa" feat. Davido, Peruzzi & Dremo (2021)
- "Hustle" (2021)
- "Mad At Me" (2021)
- "Ko Ba Mi" feat. Zlatan (2021)
- "My Other Pillow" feat. Dremo (2021)
- "Aza" (2022)
- "Blood Hot" feat. Kida Kudz & Dremo (2022)
- "No Other Way" feat. Igor Mabano (2023)
- "Not Telling Us" with Dremo (2024)
- "On God Oh Boss" feat. Dremo
