= Craig Calonica =

American mountain climber and skier

Craig Calonica is a mountain climber and skier from the United States.

== History ==
Craig Calonica represented the US Ski Team in Speed Skiing from 1974 to 1987 where he consistently placed among the top 5 and 10 in the world. He is also a climber and has climb many big walls in Yosemite National Park and to date has climbed over 28 big wall routes mostly on El Capitan. He is also an accomplished Alpine climber and has climbed in Alaska, Nepal, Tibet, Chile, Argentina, Europe, throughout the US, etc. 2008 marked his 27th year in Nepal's Himalaya, during this time he has become the leading pioneer of skiing in Nepal's Himalaya and has made hundreds of first descents.

During the winter of 1981/82 Calonica was a member of the Everest Grand Circle expedition the goal was to circumnavigate Everest, his was the first team that trekked, skied, around the peak in both Tibet and Nepal. During this expedition the team also made a first ascent of Pumori 7,161 m in the winter, it was the second successful winter ascent in Nepal, and the first winter ascent of a new route.

In August & September 1996, 1997 and 1998 he attempted to ski down Everest's North Face, but due to the constant monsoon weather was never able to reach the summit. Unfortunately the best time to ski Everest from its summit is during the monsoon season, thus why the prize of skiing Everest from its summit has been elusive.

On October 21, 1998, after skiing on the Chinese side of Everest, the California adventurer told Reuters reporters that he was convinced he had spotted the legendary yeti twice, “I saw something that was not human, that was not a gorilla, not a deer, not a goat and not a bear," he told them.
