= Pattern Recognition Letters =

- Discipline: Pattern recognition, image analysis
- Language: English
- Edited by: Gunilla Borgefors, Gabriella Sanniti di Baja, Sudeep Sarkar

Publication details
- History: 1982-present
- Publisher: North Holland
- Frequency: 16/year
- Impact factor: 3.3 (2024)

Standard abbreviations
- ISO 4: Pattern Recognit. Lett.

Indexing
- CODEN: PRLEDG
- ISSN: 0167-8655
- LCCN: 88640437
- OCLC no.: 310948140

Links
- Journal homepage; Online access

Pattern Recognition Letters is a peer-reviewed scientific journal that is published by North Holland, an imprint of Elsevier, on behalf of the International Association for Pattern Recognition. The journal produces 16 issues per year covering research on pattern recognition. The editors-in-chief are Gunilla Borgefors (Uppsala University), Gabriella Sanniti di Baja (Consiglio Nazionale delle Ricerche, Naples), and Sudeep Sarkar (University of South Florida). According to the Journal Citation Reports, the journal has a 2018 impact factor of 2.810.

== Abstracting and indexing ==
The journal is abstracted and indexed by the following services:

- ACM Computing Reviews
- Cambridge Scientific Abstracts
- CompuScience
- Computer Abstracts
- Current Contents/Engineering, Computing & Technology
- Engineering Index
- Geographical Abstracts
- INSPEC
- Science Citation Index
- Scopus
