= Commonwealth Trade Union Group =

CTUG symbol

The Commonwealth Trade Union Group (abbreviated CTUG) was a London-based international alliance of trade union in the Commonwealth countries. It was previously known as the Commonwealth Trade Union Council (abbreviated CTUC). As of 2007, the combined membership of CTUG affiliates reached 30 million.

The decision to set up the CTUC was taken at the Commonwealth Trade Union Conference, held in June 1979. In November 1979 a number of trade unions of the Commonwealth agreed to a set of proposals issued by a special working party launched at the June 1979 conference. The official founding of CTUC took place in March 1980, with Canadian Labour Congress president Dennis McDermott as the CTUC chairman and Carl Wright as the director of the organization. The stated goal of the CTUC was to guarantee that 'trade union views are taken into account by Commonwealth government and institutions'. As of 1982 the CTUC Steering Committee included McDermott (Chairman), Gopeshwar(India), W. Richardson (Australia), F. F. Walcott (Barbados), Wright, N. K. Bhatt (India), J. Harker (Canada), L. Osunde (Nigeria), E. Mashasi (Tanzania), K. Mehta (India) and R. L. Thaker (India). Shirley Carr also served as chair of CTUC.

CTUC took part in founding the Commonwealth Human Rights Initiative in 1987. In 1988 Patrick Quinn became director of CTUC, in 1994 Arthur Johnstone was named new director of CTUC. He was succeeded by Annie Watson.

CTUC was reconstructed as CTUG on 31 December 2004. The group works in cooperation with the International Trade Union Confederation. CTUG is accredited at the Commonwealth Foundation (through ITUC).

The Commonwealth Trade Union Group leadership was reconstituted at their annual conference in Geneva in June 2023. They agreed that Owen Tudor (formerly Head of TUC International Department and then ITUC Deputy General Secretary) should act as CTUG Secretary
