= International Congress on Fracture =

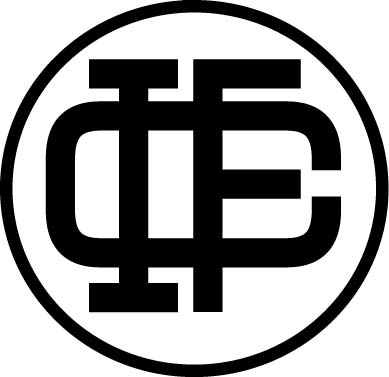
- Founded: 1965
- Founder: T. Yokobori
- Region served: Worldwide
- Services: Materials science, knowledge transfer
- Key people: R. M. McMeeking (President); T. Yokobori (Secretary General); L. Banks-Sills (Treasurer/CEO)
- Website: www.icfweb.org

International Congress on Fracture (ICF), or the International Conference on Fracture, is an international body for promoting worldwide cooperation among scientists and engineers concerned with the mechanics and mechanisms of fracture, fatigue and strength of solids.

== History ==
The idea for an International Congress on Fracture dates to 1961 and a meeting at MIT when an “Interim International Conference Committee” was established under the Chairmanship of Takeo Yokobori.

In November 1965, ICF1 was organised in Sendai, Japan. In April 1969, at ICF2 in Brighton, England, ICF was formally founded with statutes and by-laws, a Council and Executive. Thereafter ICF organised a major conference every four years. ICF also organised “interquadrennial” conferences, the first of which was in Beijing, China in November 1983. ICF established national organisations in their member nations, one of the first being the “Australasian Fracture Group” in 1971.

ICF became more than a conference organiser and rather a society for the broad field of structural integrity, fracture, fatigue, creep, corrosion and reliability – from biological to geophysical materials: metals, alloys, ceramics, composites, electronic and natural materials. The scope evolved through ICF1-1CF12 from nano to macro scales, from basic science, engineering and mathematics to practical technology and systems modelling for safe design.

At an ICF Interquadrennial Conference in Anaheim, California, May 2011 ICF was renamed “ICF: The World Academy of Structural Integrity”.

== Structure ==
ICF-WASI is governed by a Council which comprises members from each member nation, with one nation one vote. The Council meets once every four years at each ICF-WASI Quadrennial. Council delegates the management of ICF-WASI to a President and an Executive Committee.

Since ICF 6, the Treasurer has acted as the de facto CEO working closely with the President and Secretary-General. The Council elects Fellows every four years who are now termed “Academicians” (50). ICF-WASI in its widest sense consists also of the “Associates” who comprise the whole community of the up to 10,000 delegates who have attended Quadrennial and Interquadrennial conferences.

== Past meetings ==
- ICF-1 Sendi (Japan) 1965
- ICF-2 Brighton (UK) 1969
- ICF-3 Munich (Germany) 1973
- ICF-4 Waterloo (Canada) 1977
- ICF-5 Cannes (France) 1981
- ICF-6 New Delhi (India) 1984
- ICF-7 Houston (USA) 1989
- ICF-8 Kiev (Ukraine) 1993
- ICF-9 Sydney (Australia) 1997
- ICF-10 Honolulu (USA) 2001
- ICF-11 Turin (Italy) 2005
- ICF-12 Ottawa (Canada) 2009
- ICF-13 Beijing (China) 2013
- ICF-14 Rhodes (Greece) 2017
- ICF-15 Atlanta (USA) 2023

The next Conference (ICF-16) is scheduled for 2027.
