= A. E. Wilder-Smith =

British organic chemist and creationist

- Born: Arthur Ernest Wilder-Smith; 22 December 1915; Reading, Berkshire, England
- Died: 14 September 1995 (aged 79); Bern, Switzerland
- Education: Reading University (PhD); University of Geneva (PhD); ETH Zurich (PhD)

Arthur Ernest Wilder-Smith, FRSC (22 December 1915 – 14 September 1995) was a British organic chemist and young Earth creationist.

== Biography ==
Wilder-Smith earned three doctorates: he obtained his first Ph.D. in 1941 in physical organic chemistry from Reading University, his second Ph.D. in pharmacology in 1964 from the University of Geneva, and his third Ph.D. from ETH Zurich.

As a chemist, Wilder-Smith joined Imperial Chemical Industries during World War II. Following the war, the University of London made him the Countess of Lisburne Memorial Fellow. Wilder-Smith accepted an appointment as Director of Research for a Swiss pharmaceutical company. While in Switzerland, the Medical School of the University of Geneva elected him to teach Chemotherapy and Pharmacology, for which he received habilitation, the qualification required for professional appointments to European continental universities.

In 1957-1958 Wilder-Smith accepted the position of Visiting Assistant Professor at the Medical Center of the University of Illinois. In 1959-1961 he was Visiting Full Professor of Pharmacology at the University of Bergen Medical School in Norway. He returned to the University of Geneva for two years then received an appointment as Full Professor of Pharmacology back at the University of Illinois Medical Center in 1963. As a lecturer, he won three 'Golden Apple' Awards in consecutive years for excellence in education and four awards for best series of senior year lectures.

Wilder-Smith was Professor of Pharmacology for two years at Hacettepe University Medical School, Ankara, Turkey. He served as a NATO consultant for the prevention and treatment of drug abuse.

== Family life and religious views ==
In 1949, A. E. Wilder-Smith married Beate (17 September 1928 – 15 January 2015), daughter of Rev. Wilhelm Gottwaldt, of Breslau, Germany. She accompanied him through twenty-three moves of their home and rearing of their four children, Oliver, Petra, Clive, and Einar. Each of their children are also professors in their respective medical fields at international universities.

Arthur Wilder-Smith began his education as an atheist. His wife, Beate Wilder-Smith, wrote that Arthur had concluded, "If a loving God really existed, He surely would not have tolerated all the injustice and suffering evident in the world." He became acquainted with General Frost, a devout Christian who challenged Arthur's atheistic worldview. Arthur placed his faith in Christ but continued to struggle intellectually with the difficulties between naturalistic evolution and biblical creation. While studying at Oxford, Arthur became acquainted with C. S. Lewis, a significant influence on Arthur's thought processes and faith.

As a creationist, Wilder-Smith said there were problems with evolutionary views of the origin of life. This theme is reflected in many of his books including, The Creation of Life and Man's Origin, Man's Destiny. According to Walter L. Bradley, Wilder-Smith contended "that the conversion of energy flow into information remains, at present, undemonstrated and without theoretical basis." Some considered him Europe's leading creationist. He was not afraid to correct creationists when he believed they were wrong as when he made the comment to Francis Arduini in 1984 that Henry M. Morris "didn't know a thing about thermodynamics".

In 1966 he published the book Herkunft und Zukunft des Menschen which promoted Burdick's and other's claims that dinosaur and human footprints existed together at Paluxy River. Wilder-Smith included in his book plates showing the Paluxy site including plates attributed to himself, Burdick and Taylor. With the exception of plate 6 from Burdick all plates claiming to be man tracks were in situ. In the mid-1980s the footprints were shown to be not of human origin, and some specimens were shown to be doctored or carved, in particular the loose blocks attributed to Burdick.

In 1970, Wilder-Smith published The Creation of Life: A Cybernetic Approach to Evolution which defended William Paley's design argument with computer calculations of the improbability of genetic sequences, which he said could not be explained by evolution but required "the abhorred necessity of divine intelligent activity behind nature," and that "the same problem would be expected to beset the relationship between the designer behind nature and the intelligently designed part of nature known as man." His research and writing were influential in the formation of the intelligent design movement. In 2005, intelligent design advocate William A. Dembski wrote that Wilder-Smith's "intuitive ideas about information has been the impetus for much of my research." Wilder-Smith had never used the phrase "intelligent design" itself. The closest phrasing may be found in his 1968 publication Man’s origin, man’s destiny: a critical survey of the principles of evolution and Christianity, which with its argument that the mammary glands in whales could not have arisen by chance mutations. Wilder-Smith wrote that (emphasis added) "To deny planning when studying such a system is to strain credulity more than to ask one to believe in an intelligent nipple designer, who incidentally must have understood hydraulics rather well."

In the 1986 Oxford Union debate, Wilder-Smith and creationist physicist Edgar Andrews (President of the Biblical Creation Society) debated creationism with biologists Richard Dawkins and John Maynard Smith.

Wilder-Smith's book The Natural Sciences Know Nothing of Evolution was published in 1981 by an imprint of Creation-Life Publishing, and reprinted in 1992 by Answers in Genesis. Kenneth Christiansen, a biologist at Grinnell College, reviewed the book stating "the most fundamental flaw of the book is an apparent confusion or ignorance (it is hard to tell) concerning our present understanding of the evolutionary process." He further noted that Wilder-Smith's work disregarded basic literature in the field discussed. In 1998 the book was one of 19 which a public school board in Melvindale, Michigan, voted to purchase for school libraries "to make sure the district was not supporting the theory of evolution as a fact". An analysis by the National Center for Science Education described the book as "religious doctrine in disguise" promoting the intelligent design argument, with abundant errors typical of creation science, misrepresenting the science of evolution.

== Honours ==
Wilder-Smith was a Fellow of the Royal Society of Chemistry

== Bibliography ==
- Urinary elimination of synthetic oestrogens and stilboestrol glucuronide in animals. (Biochem J. 1948; 42(2): 253–257)
- The isolation and properties of the monoglucuronides of stilboestrol, hexoestrol and dienoestrol (Biochem J. 1948; 42(2): 258–260)
- Preparation of some new 4-substituted derivatives of p-amino-o-hydroxyphenyl-1,3,4-oxadiazolone-5 and study of their mycobacteriostatic activity. VII. (Arzneimittelforschung. 1967 Jun;17(6):768-72)
- Some tuberculostatic 1,3,4-oxadiazolones(-5) and 1,3,4-oxadiazolthiones(-5). II: Biological spectrum in vitro and activity in vivo in relation to resistance emergence. (Arzneimittelforschung. 1962 Mar;12:275-80.)
- The excretion of synthetic oestrogens as ethereal sulphates and monoglucuronides in the rabbit and in man (Biochem J. 1949; 44(3): 366–368. )
- The Action of Phosgene on Acid Hydrazides to Give 1,3,4-Oxdiazolones of Interest in the Treatment of Tuberculosis (Science, Volume 119, Issue 3094, pp. 514)
- Metabolism of Synthetic Œstrogens in Man (nature 160, 787-787 (6 December 1947))
- M. B. Sahasrabudhe, A. E. Wilder Smith (1947) The determination of dienoestrol Biochem J.; 41(2): 190–192.
- THE INSTABILITY OF OESTROGENS IN SOLUTION (J Endocrinol January 1, 1946 5 152–157)
- Preliminary screening of some new oxadiazol-2-ols with special reference to their antipyretic, analgesic, and anti-inflammatory properties. V. (Arzneimittelforschung. 1963 Apr;13:338-41.)
- Smith, A. E. W., Frommel, E. and Morris, R. W. (1959), Effect of Local Anaesthetics on Barbiturate Sleeping Time. Journal of Pharmacy and Pharmacology, 11: 600–606.
- A. E. WILDER SMITH & HANS BRODHAGE (1961) Biological Spectrum of Some New Tuberculostatic 1,3,4-Oxadiazolones with Special Reference to Cross-Resistance and Rates of Emergence of Resistance Nature 192, 1195 (23 December 1961)
- Why Does God Allow It? and Other Essays. (Victory Press, 1960) ASIN B0000CKQ3P
- The Scientific Alternative to Neo-Darwinian Evolutionary Theory. (The Word For Today, 1987)
- The Natural Sciences Know Nothing of Evolution. Master Books/Institute for Creation Research, 1981. ISBN 0-89051-062-8
- Man's Origin/Man's Destiny. Harold Shaw; 1st edition (January 1, 1969), (paperback Bethany House Pub, June 1975) ISBN 0-87123-356-8
- He Who Thinks Has To Believe (The Word For Today, 1981)
- The Creation of Life: Cybernetic approach to evolution (H. Shaw; [1st ed.] edition, 1970) (Master Books/Institute for Creation Research, 1981) ISBN 0-89051-070-9
- The Time Dimension. (Word for Today, October 1993) ISBN 0-936728-45-0
- Why Does God Allow It? (Victory Press, 1960) (Master Books/Institute for Creation Research, 1980) ISBN 0-89051-060-1
- Is This a God of Love?. (Word for Today, December 1991) ISBN 0-936728-39-6
