= Gunilla Borgefors =

Swedish image processing researcher

Gunilla Borgefors (born 1952) is a Swedish computer scientist specializing in image processing, including distance transforms, topological skeletonization, and edge detection. She is a professor emerita in the Department of Information Technology at Uppsala University, associated with the Centre for Image Analysis.

== Early life and education ==
Borgefors was born in 1952 in Norrköping. She earned a master's degree in applied mathematics at Linköping University in 1975, and completed a Ph.D. in numerical analysis at the KTH Royal Institute of Technology in 1986. Her dissertation, On Hierarchical Edge Matching in Digital Images Using Distance Transformations, was jointly supervised by Germund Dahlquist and Jan-Olof Eklundh.

She also has a master's degree in journalism, earned in 2007 at Uppsala University.

== Career ==
After working for the Swedish Defence Research Agency in Linköping from 1982 to 1993, and becoming director of research for computer vision and head of the Division of Information Systems there, she moved in 1993 to a professorship at the Swedish University of Agricultural Sciences, where she headed the Centre for Image Analysis. In 2005 she began a guest professorship at Uppsala University and in 2012 she moved to a full-time professorship at Uppsala.

She served as editor-in-chief of the journal Pattern Recognition Letters, beginning in 2011, and was president of the Swedish Society for Automated Image Analysis from 1988 to 1992.

== Recognition ==
Borgefors was named a Fellow of the International Association for Pattern Recognition in 1998, "for contributions to digital geometry and for outstanding service to IAPR". She became an IEEE Fellow in 2008, "for contributions to discrete geometry and image analysis".

She became a member of the Royal Society of Sciences in Uppsala in 2000, and a member of the Royal Swedish Academy of Engineering Sciences in 2011. She was the 2007 winner of the Edlund Prize of the Royal Swedish Academy of Sciences.
