= Arab Towns Organization =

The Arab Towns Organization (ATO) (Arabic: منظمة المدن العربية) is an independent, non-governmental, non-profit regional Arab organization with diplomatic status. It was established on 15 March 1967 and has its permanent headquarters in Kuwait City, the capital of the State of Kuwait. Its membership includes more than 650 Arab cities, as well as several regional and international institutions and organizations holding observer member status.

The organization serves as an institutional framework dedicated to the affairs of Arab cities, municipalities, and equivalent local authorities. It aims to develop municipal administration, strengthen urban governance, promote cooperation and integration among its members, encourage the exchange of expertise and best practices, and contribute to addressing shared urban challenges by supporting practical solutions that advance sustainable urban development across the Arab world.

The current Secretary-General of the organization is Bader Wael Bader Al-Ajeel Al-Askar, who assumed office in November 2025.

== History and establishment ==
The Arab Towns Organization was founded on 15 March 1967 in Kuwait to strengthen cooperation among Arab cities and support the development of municipal and local institutions.

Since its establishment, the organization has expanded its activities to include urban planning, local governance, environmental protection, urban heritage preservation, and sustainable urban development.

Over the decades, ATO has established seven specialized affiliated institutions to support its objectives, provide technical expertise, develop professional capacities, and promote cooperation and knowledge exchange among member cities.

== Objectives ==
According to its official website, the Arab Towns Organization seeks to strengthen cooperation among Arab cities, develop municipal administration, and support sustainable urban development. Its objectives are as follows:

1. Modernizing municipal administration and governance: Improving the performance of Arab cities and enabling them to adopt modern administrative and service systems, while leveraging digital technologies, innovation, artificial intelligence (AI), and the Internet of Things (IoT) in planning, management, and decision-making to enhance local governance efficiency, transparency, and the quality of public services.
2. Promoting sustainable urban development: Building Arab cities capable of achieving balanced and sustainable urban development that considers economic and social dimensions, strengthens their capacity for growth and prosperity, and addresses urban challenges through practical, applicable solutions that improve services and quality of life.
3. Preserving urban identity and heritage: Safeguarding the architectural, urban, and historical identity of Arab cities, protecting their cultural and architectural heritage, and enhancing their cultural and tourism significance.
4. Addressing environmental and climate challenges: Strengthening the preparedness of Arab cities to address environmental and climate challenges and improving the efficiency of resource, energy, water, and waste management in accordance with circular economy principles.
5. Enhancing the competitiveness of Arab cities: Improving the competitiveness of Arab cities and enabling them to become more attractive destinations for investment, employment, and quality living, while supporting innovation-driven and productive local urban economies.
6. Developing municipal institutions and human capacities: Advancing technologically enabled local administrative systems, developing human resources, improving institutional and municipal performance, and supporting digital transformation and innovation through the application of modern technologies.
7. Strengthening cooperation and partnerships: Promoting institutional integration and cooperation among Arab cities, supporting joint initiatives and projects, and expanding Arab, regional, and international partnerships that serve the organization's objectives and its member cities.
8. Building urban resilience: Enhancing the capacity of Arab cities to respond to crises, disasters, and climate-related risks while ensuring the continuity of essential services.
9. Developing urban performance measurement: Strengthening urban performance measurement systems, evaluating levels of achievement, and supporting planning and decision-making processes in Arab cities.
10. Promoting community participation and good governance: Supporting community participation and stakeholder engagement in shaping urban policies and strategies, contributing to sustainable local development and reinforcing the principles of good governance.
11. Encouraging municipal excellence and innovation: Promoting excellence and innovation in municipal administration and urban development, and supporting pioneering initiatives and practices that contribute to the advancement of Arab cities and improve institutional and service performance.

Source: Arab Towns Organization – Objectives.

== Membership ==
The Arab Towns Organization includes cities and municipalities from Arab countries among its members. It also provides opportunities for participation by institutions and individuals interested in municipal affairs and urban development.

As of 2026, the organization comprises more than 650 member cities and municipalities across 22 Arab countries:

Algeria, Bahrain, Comoros, Djibouti, Egypt, Iraq, Jordan, Kuwait, Lebanon, Libya, Mauritania, Morocco, Oman, Palestine, Qatar, Saudi Arabia, Somalia, Sudan, Syria, Tunisia, the United Arab Emirates, and Yemen.

Through its membership network, the organization facilitates the exchange of municipal expertise and experiences, strengthens cooperation in addressing urban challenges, and promotes the development of joint initiatives and projects among member cities.

== Organizational structure and governance ==
The Arab Towns Organization operates through three principal governing and administrative bodies.

=== General Assembly ===
The General Assembly is the organization's principal deliberative and decision-making body. It brings together representatives of member cities to discuss general policies, strategic directions, priorities, and matters relating to municipal cooperation.

=== Executive Council ===
The Executive Council oversees organizational affairs and decisions between General Assembly sessions and supervises the implementation of the organization's policies and resolutions.

=== General Secretariat ===
The General Secretariat is headquartered in Kuwait and is responsible for the organization's administration, coordination, and implementation of its programs and activities. It is headed by the Secretary-General, who represents the organization in its institutional, regional, and international relations.

== Affiliated institutions ==
The Arab Towns Organization has seven specialized affiliated institutions operating in the fields of urban development, municipal administration, environmental sustainability, technological innovation, heritage preservation, and cultural cooperation.

=== 1. Arab Towns Development Fund ===
Established: 1970

Headquarters: Arab Towns Organization General Secretariat, Kuwait City, Kuwait.

The fund supports initiatives related to urban development, municipal capacity building, and cooperation among Arab cities.

=== 2. Arab Urban Development Institute ===
Established: 1980

Headquarters: Riyadh, Saudi Arabia.

The institute serves as the organization's scientific and documentation body, supporting research, knowledge exchange, and technical expertise in urban and municipal development.

=== 3. Arab Towns Award Foundation ===
Established: 1983

Headquarters: Doha, Qatar.

The foundation organizes and administers awards recognizing outstanding achievements and contributions to the development of Arab cities.

=== 4. Environmental Center for Arab Towns ===
Established: 2006

Headquarters: Dubai, United Arab Emirates.

The center serves as the organization's specialized institution for environmental protection and sustainable development, providing services to ATO and its member cities in various environmental fields.

=== 5. Arab Smart Cities Forum ===
Established: 2007

Headquarters: Amman, Jordan.

The forum specializes in technology, information systems, and the digital and smart transformation of Arab cities. It promotes the adoption of modern technologies to improve municipal administration and public services.

=== 6. Arab Heritage and Historical Cities Foundation ===
Established: 2007

Headquarters: Tunis, Tunisia.

The foundation focuses on preserving the cultural and architectural heritage of historic Arab cities and supporting efforts to safeguard their urban identity and manage their heritage assets.

=== 7. Arab Towns Cultural Action Group ===
Established: 2016

Headquarters: Amman, Jordan.

The group works to promote cultural development, support cultural activities and initiatives, and facilitate the exchange of experiences and expertise among Arab cities in cultural and community-related fields.

== International cooperation and partnerships ==
The Arab Towns Organization cooperates with regional and international institutions and organizations involved in urban development, municipal governance, sustainability, and local administration.

The organization has participated in initiatives aimed at strengthening cooperation between Arab municipalities and international networks of cities and local authorities.

Among its historical international partnerships was its participation in the Euro-Arab Forum, alongside the Standing Committee for the Euro-Mediterranean Partnership of Local and Regional Authorities (COPPEM), the Council of European Municipalities and Regions (CEMR), and the Congress of Local and Regional Authorities of the Council of Europe.

The forum organized conferences in Dubai in 2008 and Málaga, Spain, in 2011.

In October 2026, the organization signed a memorandum of understanding with the World Green Economy Organization to strengthen cooperation in sustainable urban development, climate action, capacity building, and green economy initiatives.

== General assemblies and Executive Council sessions ==
The Arab Towns Organization convenes its General Assemblies and Executive Council meetings to discuss organizational policies, strengthen municipal cooperation, and address challenges facing Arab cities.

The 20th General Assembly and the 64th Executive Council session were held in Salalah, Dhofar Governorate, Sultanate of Oman, on 7–8 September 2026, under the theme "More Innovative and Sustainable Cities" (Arabic: مدن أكثر ابتكارًا واستدامةً).

The meetings brought together representatives of Arab cities and municipalities to discuss innovation, digital transformation, sustainable urban development, infrastructure, and cooperation among local authorities.

== Digital transformation and municipal innovation ==
The Arab Towns Organization supports the exchange of knowledge and expertise related to digital transformation and smart city development.

Its areas of interest include digital municipal services, urban data management, innovative public administration, and the use of modern technologies to improve the quality and efficiency of municipal services.

The organization also operates an official digital platform through which it publishes institutional information, news, activities, publications, and information about its member cities.

== Publications and knowledge exchange ==
The Arab Towns Organization promotes the exchange of knowledge, expertise, and municipal experiences through publications, conferences, technical meetings, and institutional cooperation.

Among its publications is Arab City Magazine (Arabic: مجلة المدينة العربية), which covers topics relating to urban development, municipal affairs, cultural heritage, and the experiences of Arab cities in various fields.
