= Derek Hull =

British material scientist

Professor Derek Hull FRS FREng FIMMM

Goldsmiths' Professor of Metallurgy, University of Cambridge
- In office 1984–1991

Henry Bell Wortley Professor of Materials Engineering, University of Liverpool
- In office 1964–1984

Personal details
- Born: 8 August 1931 (age 95)

Derek Hull (born 8 August 1931) is a British material scientist, and Henry Bell Wortley Chair of Metallurgy, at the University of Liverpool. He was awarded the A. A. Griffith Medal and Prize in 1985.

He is the son of William Hull and Nellie Hayes. He is the elder brother of paediatrician Sir David Hull.

== Works ==
- Introduction to Dislocations. Pergamon Press. 1965. ISBN 9780080966731.; Elsevier, 2011, ISBN 978-0-08-096672-4
- An Introduction to Composite Materials. Cambridge University Press. 1996. ISBN 978-0-521-38855-9.
- Fractography: Observing Measuring and Interpreting Fracture Surface Topography. Cambridge University Press. 1999. ISBN 978-0-521-64684-0.
- Celtic and Anglo-Saxon Art: Geometric Aspects. Liverpool University Press. 2003. ISBN 978-0-85323-549-1.
