= Sean Holly =

British economist

Sean Holly is an economist at the University of Cambridge, where he is an emeritus professor of economics and life fellow of Fitzwilliam College, Cambridge. Before becoming a professor at Cambridge, he held positions at Imperial College London, the London Business School, and Sheffield University. From 2018 to 2023 he was on the board of governors of the National Institute for Economic and Social Research.

He is a coauthor of the book Optimal Control, Expectations and Uncertainty (with Andrew Hughes-Hallet, Cambridge University Press, 1989).
