= Ibrahim Taguri =

British politician (born 1978)

Ibrahim Taguri (born September 1978) is a British community worker and political candidate. He is the former Race Equality Champion of the Liberal Democrats, announced in the role by party leader Nick Clegg on 21 January 2015 at a meeting of Ethnic Minority Liberal Democrats. In December 2013 Taguri was selected to succeed Sarah Teather MP as the Liberal Democrat candidate for the London constituency of Brent Central in the 2015 general election.

Taguri is also a former undefeated British boxer, who last fought in 2008.

== Early life and education ==
Taguri was born in Brent and grew up in Willesden Green, London, England. In a 2014 interview, he said: "My parents came here in 1977 to escape the Gaddafi regime in Libya and my mum was at the time one of the few females going through university. She was going to become a lawyer but because of the nature of the regime, they decided to leave and they came here as cleaners to start again. So I grew up in social housing till I was thirteen.... There was a very heavy threat of homelessness that hung over the family for several years."

Taguri attended Latymer Upper School, one of the last pupils to benefit from the Assisted Places Scheme, and went on to study English Literature and Language at the University of Reading. When he was in his early twenties he took up boxing and had his debut fight at the York Hall, Bethnal Green.

== Political career ==
For more than 15 years Taguri has worked for several London-based charities in campaigning and fundraising capacities (including within the hospice movement and with children's charities), and most recently for the Liberal Democrats, before being chosen to run as their candidate for the 2015 election in the Brent Central seat previously held (since 2003) by Sarah Teather. He states that his mission in politics is to eradicate child poverty in the UK by 2020. In the course of his campaigning, he compared politics to boxing, as they both are "all about preparation and training. It's not what happened on polling day, it's what happens in the months before." Taguri though was forced to stand down as fundraiser, race and equality champion and candidate when he was caught in a sting operation by The Daily Telegraph apparently accepting donations in exchange for access, as well as suggesting ways of funneling the donations to hide their origins.

Taguri has written for publications including the New Statesman and the Huffington Post, writing about issues that reflect his concerns, which include UK immigration policy, informed by his own experience as the eldest child of a working-class immigrant family; increasing parents' access to affordable childcare, improving educational standards and fighting poverty through radical tax reform, defending civil liberties in the UK and abroad, and environmental topics such as fracking.

== Personal life ==
Taguri is a supporter of Tottenham Hotspur FC.
