= Colin Humphreys =

British physicist

Professor Sir Colin Humphreys CBE FRS FREng FIMMM FInstP
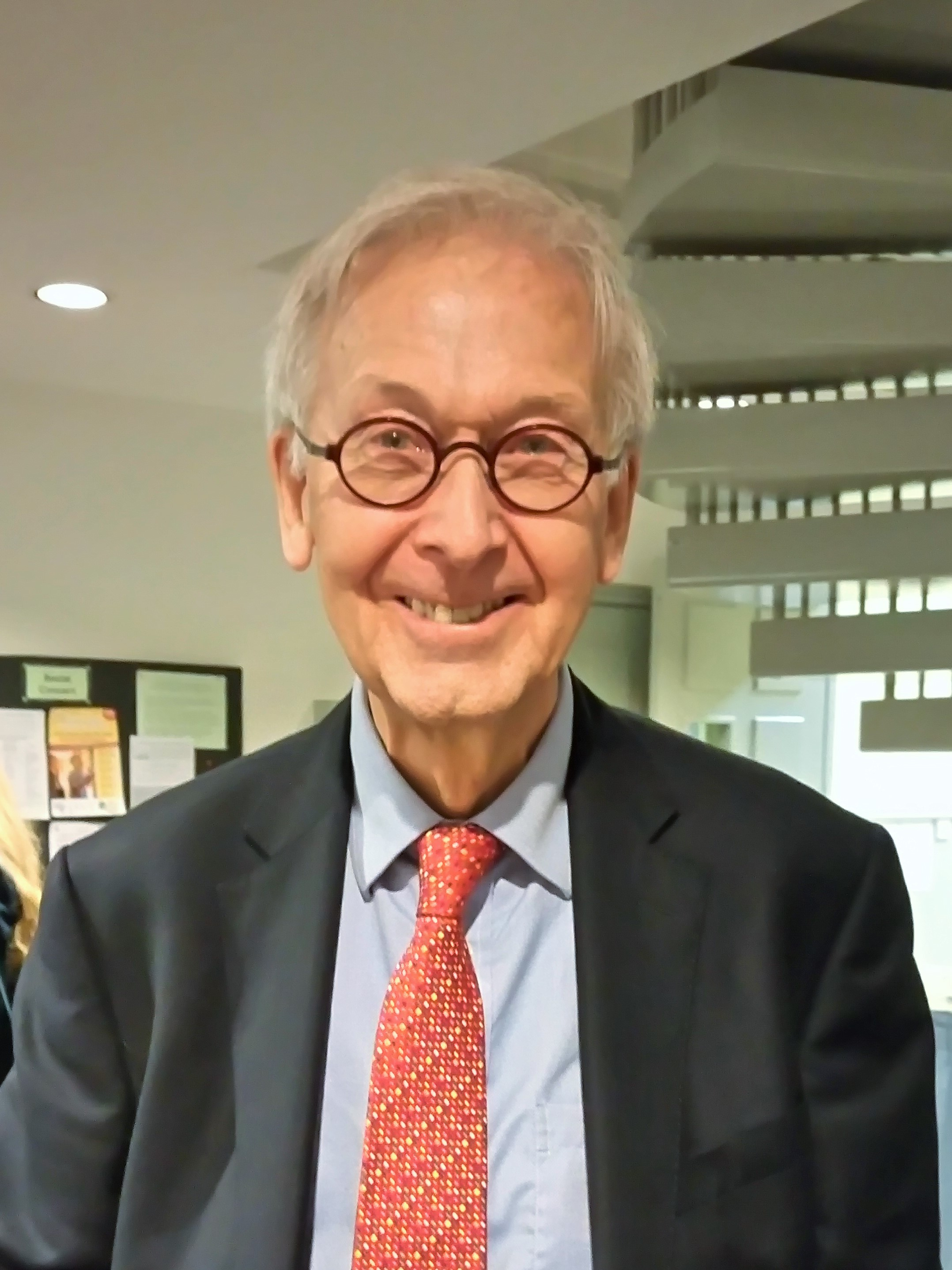
- Colin Humphreys in Cambridge, 2015
- Born: Colin John Humphreys; 24 May 1941 (age 85)
- Education: Luton Grammar School
- Alma mater: Imperial College London (BSc) University of Oxford (MA); University of Cambridge (PhD)
- Awards: A. A. Griffith Medal and Prize (2001) Queen’s Medal (2022)
- Scientific career
- Fields: Materials science Graphene; Gallium Nitride; Electron microscopy Science and religion
- Workplaces: Queen Mary University of London; University of Cambridge; Royal Institution
- Thesis: Aspects of multiple beam electron diffraction and X-ray diffraction topography (1969)
- Doctoral students: Amanda Petford-Long
- Website: www.gan.msm.cam.ac.uk/directory/humphreys

Sir Colin John Humphreys (born 24 May 1941) is a British physicist and a hobbyist Bible scholar. He is the Professor of Materials Science at Queen Mary University of London.

He is the former Goldsmiths' Professor of Materials Science at the University of Cambridge and the Professor of Experimental Physics at the Royal Institution in London. He served as President of the Institute of Materials, Minerals and Mining in 2002 and 2003. His research interests include "all aspects of electron microscopy and analysis, semiconductors (particularly gallium nitride), ultra-high temperature aerospace materials and superconductors." Humphreys also "studies the Bible when not pursuing his day-job as a materials scientist."

== Education ==
Humphreys was educated at Luton Grammar School, Imperial College London (BSc) and Churchill College, Cambridge where he was awarded a PhD in 1969. He was awarded a Master of Arts degree from Jesus College, Oxford.

== Career and research ==
=== Semiconductors ===
Humphreys is a materials scientist who has carried out work on the electron microscopy of semiconducting materials. His research on gallium nitride (GaN) has resulted in a substantially improved understanding of this material with a wide range of technological applications.

In addition to its potential use within transistors as a next-generation alternative to silicon, GaN emits a brilliant light that makes it an ideal candidate for use in energy-saving LEDs. Colin has pioneered the development of low-cost, high-efficiency GaN-on-silicon (or ‘GaN-on-Si’) LEDs, which are now being manufactured based on his patented research. GaN LED lighting could save the United Kingdom £2 billion per year in electricity costs.

Humphreys is a member of the John Templeton Foundation. and a member of the Advisory Council for the Campaign for Science and Engineering.

=== Biblical studies ===
==== Date of Last Supper ====
In 2011, Humphreys claimed in his book The Mystery of the Last Supper that the Last Supper took place on Wednesday (Holy Wednesday), not as traditionally thought Thursday (Maundy Thursday), and that the apparent timing discrepancies (Nisan 15 or 14) between the gospels of Matthew, Mark, and Luke versus John are rooted in the use of different calendars by the writers. Mark, Matthew and Luke appear to use an older, Egyptian-style Jewish calendar (still used today by the Samaritans) while John appears to refer to the newer, Babylonian-style Jewish calendar (still in use by modern Jews). The Last Supper being on Wednesday would allow more time for interrogation and presentation to Pilate prior to the crucifixion on Friday than given in the traditional view. Humphreys proposed the actual date for the Last Supper to be 1 April 33.

==== Eclipse made "sun stand still" ====
In a 2017 paper written together with Graeme Waddington, Humphreys offered an astronomical explanation for the biblical story of the sun standing still over Gibeon during the Israelites' victorious battle against the Amorites (Joshua 10:12), namely an annular eclipse which occurred on 30 October 1207 BCE.

== Awards and honours ==
Humphreys was elected in 1996 as a Fellow of the Royal Academy of Engineering He won the Institute of Physics Kelvin Medal and Prize in 2000. Humphreys was awarded the A. A. Griffith Medal and Prize in 2001 and a CBE in 2003 for services to science as a researcher and communicator. He was knighted in the 2010 Birthday Honours and in 2011 elected a Fellow of the Royal Society In 2015 he was elected as an Honorary Fellow of the Royal Microscopical Society. He is also mentioned in Debrett's People of Today.

== Bibliography ==
- The Miracles of Exodus: a Scientist Reveals the Extraordinary Natural Causes Underlying the Biblical Miracles (HarperCollins, 2003).
- "The Mystery of the Last Supper: Reconstructing the Final Days of Jesus." (Cambridge University Press, 2011) ISBN 0-521-73200-X

== See also ==
- Chronology of Jesus#Double Passover method
