= Centre for Infectious Disease Research in Zambia =

Zambian non-profit organisation

The Centre for Infectious Disease Research in Zambia (CIDRZ) is a non-profit organisation founded in 2001 as collaboration between the University of Alabama at Birmingham, USA, the Ministry of Health of Zambia and the University of Zambia School of Medicine. In 2011, CIDRZ became an independent, Zambian, non-governmental organisation able to collaborate with multiple local and international universities.

CIDRZ has managed more than 100 grants supporting program implementation and research in key health areas, including HIV/AIDS prevention and treatment, tuberculosis diagnosis and control, maternal and reproductive health, child and newborn care, and initiatives to strengthen health systems. These grants facilitate a broad impact across healthcare delivery and public health research, addressing critical needs in resource-limited settings.

== Leadership ==
In early 2013, the leadership of CIDRZ changed to CEO Dr Charles Holmes MD, MPH and Deputy CEO Dr Izukanji Sikazwe MBChB, MPH and the organisation released a revised strategic plan and recruited a new board of directors. At the end of 2016 in a planned transition, Dr Izukanji Sikazwe became the CEO.
