= Martempering =

Martempering is also known as stepped quenching or interrupted quenching. In this process, steel is heated above the upper critical point (above the transformation range) and then quenched in a hot-oil, molten-salt, or molten-lead bath kept at a temperature of 150-300 °C. The workpiece is maintained at a temperature above the martensite start (Ms) point until uniform temperature is achieved throughout its cross-section. It is then cooled to room temperature, typically in air or oil. The steel is then tempered. In this process, austenite is transformed to martensite by step quenching, at a rate fast enough to avoid the formation of ferrite, pearlite, or bainite.

In the martempering process, austenitized metal part is immersed in a bath at a temperature just above the martensite start temperature (Ms). Interrupted quenching involves halting the cooling process at a temperature above the martensite transformation region, allowing sufficient time for the center of the workpiece to reach the same temperature as the surface. The metal part is then removed from the bath and cooled in air to room temperature to permit the austenite to transform to martensite. Martempering is a technique used to control the stresses and strains that develop during the quenching of a steel component. In this process, the steel is heated above the critical range to transform it entirely into austenite.

The drawback of this process is that the large section cannot be heat treated by this process.

== See also ==
- Austempering
- Tempering (metallurgy)
