= Heat treating =

Process of heating something to alter it

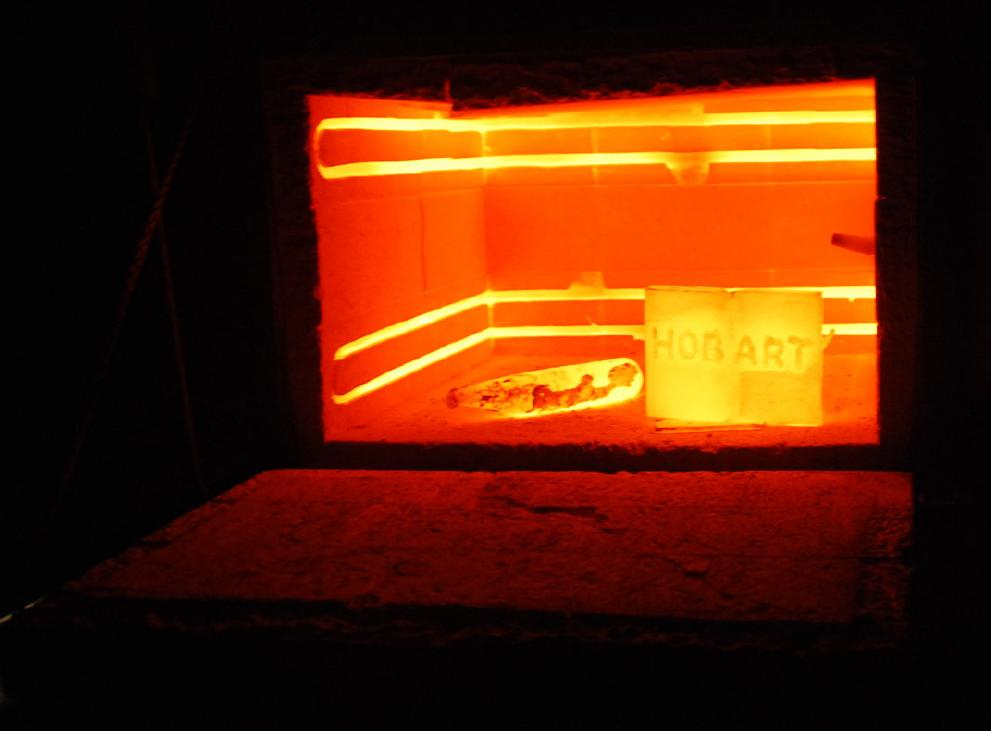
Heat treating furnace at 1,800 °F (980 °C)

Heat treating (or heat treatment) is a group of industrial, thermal and metalworking processes used to alter the physical, and sometimes chemical properties of a material. The most common application is metallurgical. Heat treatments are also used in the manufacture of many other materials, such as glass. Heat treatment involves the use of heating or chilling, normally to extreme temperatures, to achieve the desired result, such as the softening or hardening of a material. Heat treatment techniques include annealing, case hardening, precipitation strengthening, tempering, carburizing, normalizing and quenching. Although the term heat treatment applies only to processes where the heating and cooling are done for the specific purpose of altering properties intentionally, heating and cooling often occur incidentally during other manufacturing processes, such as hot forming or welding.

== Physical processes ==
Allotropes of iron, showing the differences in lattice structures between alpha iron (low temperature) and gamma iron (high temperature). The alpha iron has no spaces for carbon atoms to reside, while the gamma iron is open to the free movement of small carbon atoms.

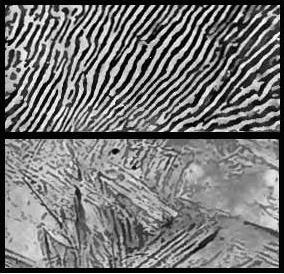
Photomicrographs of steel. Top: In annealed (slowly cooled) steel, the carbon precipitates forming layers of ferrite (iron) and cementite (carbide). Bottom: In quenched (quickly cooled) steel, the carbon remains trapped in the iron, creating great internal stresses in the needle or plate-like grains.

Metallic materials consist of a microstructure of small crystals called "grains" or crystallites. The nature of the grains (i.e. grain size and composition) is one of the most effective factors that can determine the overall mechanical behavior of the metal. Heat treatment provides an efficient way to manipulate the properties of the metal by controlling the rate of diffusion and the rate of cooling within the microstructure. Heat treating is often used to alter the mechanical properties of a metallic alloy, manipulating properties such as the hardness, strength, toughness, ductility, and elasticity.

There are two mechanisms that may change an alloy's properties during heat treatment: the formation of martensite causes the crystals to deform intrinsically, and the diffusion mechanism causes changes in the homogeneity of the alloy.

The crystal structure consists of atoms that are grouped in a very specific arrangement, called a lattice. In most elements, this order will rearrange itself, depending on conditions like temperature and pressure. This rearrangement called allotropy or polymorphism, may occur several times, at many different temperatures for a particular metal. In alloys, this rearrangement may cause an element that will not normally dissolve into the base metal to suddenly become soluble, while a reversal of the allotropy will make the elements either partially or completely insoluble.

When in the soluble state, the process of diffusion causes the atoms of the dissolved element to spread out, attempting to form a homogenous distribution within the crystals of the base metal. If the alloy is cooled to an insoluble state, the atoms of the dissolved constituents (solutes) may migrate out of the solution. This type of diffusion, called precipitation, leads to nucleation, where the migrating atoms group together at the grain-boundaries. This forms a microstructure generally consisting of two or more distinct phases. For instance, steel that has been heated above the austenitizing temperature (red to orange-hot, or around 1,500 °F (820 °C) to 1,600 °F (870 °C) depending on carbon content), and then cooled slowly, forms a laminated structure composed of alternating layers of ferrite and cementite, becoming soft pearlite. After heating the steel to the austenite phase and then quenching it in water, the microstructure will be in the martensitic phase. This is due to the fact that the steel will change from the austenite phase to the martensite phase after quenching. Some pearlite or ferrite may be present if the quench did not rapidly cool off all the steel.

Unlike iron-based alloys, most heat-treatable alloys do not experience a ferrite transformation. In these alloys, the nucleation at the grain-boundaries often reinforces the structure of the crystal matrix. These metals harden by precipitation. Typically a slow process, depending on temperature, this is often referred to as "age hardening".

Many metals and non-metals exhibit a martensite transformation when cooled quickly (with external media like oil, polymer, water, etc.). When a metal is cooled very quickly, the insoluble atoms may not be able to migrate out of the solution in time. This is called a "diffusionless transformation." When the crystal matrix changes to its low-temperature arrangement, the atoms of the solute become trapped within the lattice. The trapped atoms prevent the crystal matrix from completely changing into its low-temperature allotrope, creating shearing stresses within the lattice. When some alloys are cooled quickly, such as steel, the martensite transformation hardens the metal, while in others, like aluminum, the alloy becomes softer.

== Effects of composition ==
Phase diagram of an iron-carbon alloying system. Phase changes occur at different temperatures (vertical axis) for different compositions (horizontal axis). The dotted lines mark the eutectoid (A) and eutectic (B) compositions.

The specific composition of an alloy system will usually have a great effect on the results of heat treating. If the percentage of each constituent is just right, the alloy will form a single, continuous microstructure upon cooling. Such a mixture is said to be eutectoid. However, If the percentage of the solutes varies from the eutectoid mixture, two or more different microstructures will usually form simultaneously. A hypo eutectoid solution contains less of the solute than the eutectoid mix, while a hypereutectoid solution contains more.

=== Eutectoid alloys ===
A eutectoid (eutectic-like) alloy is similar in behavior to a eutectic alloy. A eutectic alloy is characterized by having a single melting point. This melting point is lower than that of any of the constituents, and no change in the mixture will lower the melting point any further. When a molten eutectic alloy is cooled, all of the constituents will crystallize into their respective phases at the same temperature.

A eutectoid alloy is similar, but the phase change occurs, not from a liquid, but from a solid solution. Upon cooling a eutectoid alloy from the solution temperature, the constituents will separate into different crystal phases, forming a single microstructure. A eutectoid steel, for example, contains 0.77% carbon. Upon cooling slowly, the solution of iron and carbon (a single phase called austenite) will separate into platelets of the phases ferrite and cementite. This forms a layered microstructure called pearlite.

Since pearlite is harder than iron, the degree of softness achievable is typically limited to that produced by the pearlite. Similarly, the hardenability is limited by the continuous martensitic microstructure formed when cooled very fast.

=== Hypoeutectoid alloys ===
A hypoeutectic alloy has two separate melting points. Both are above the eutectic melting point for the system but are below the melting points of any constituent forming the system. Between these two melting points, the alloy will exist as part solid and part liquid. The constituent with the higher melting point will solidify first. When completely solidified, a hypoeutectic alloy will often be in a solid solution.

Similarly, a hypoeutectoid alloy has two critical temperatures, called "arrests". Between these two temperatures, the alloy will exist partly as the solution and partly as a separate crystallizing phase, called the "pro eutectoid phase". These two temperatures are called the upper (A_{3}) and lower (A_{1}) transformation temperatures. As the solution cools from the upper transformation temperature toward an insoluble state, the excess base metal will often be forced to "crystallize-out", becoming the pro eutectoid. This will occur until the remaining concentration of solutes reaches the eutectoid level, which will then crystallize as a separate microstructure.

For example, a hypoeutectoid steel contains less than 0.77% carbon. Upon cooling a hypoeutectoid steel from the austenite transformation temperature, small islands of proeutectoid-ferrite will form. These will continue to grow and the carbon will recede until the eutectoid concentration in the rest of the steel is reached. This eutectoid mixture will then crystallize as a microstructure of pearlite. Since ferrite is softer than pearlite, the two microstructures combine to increase the ductility of the alloy. Consequently, the hardenability of the alloy is lowered.

=== Hypereutectoid alloys ===
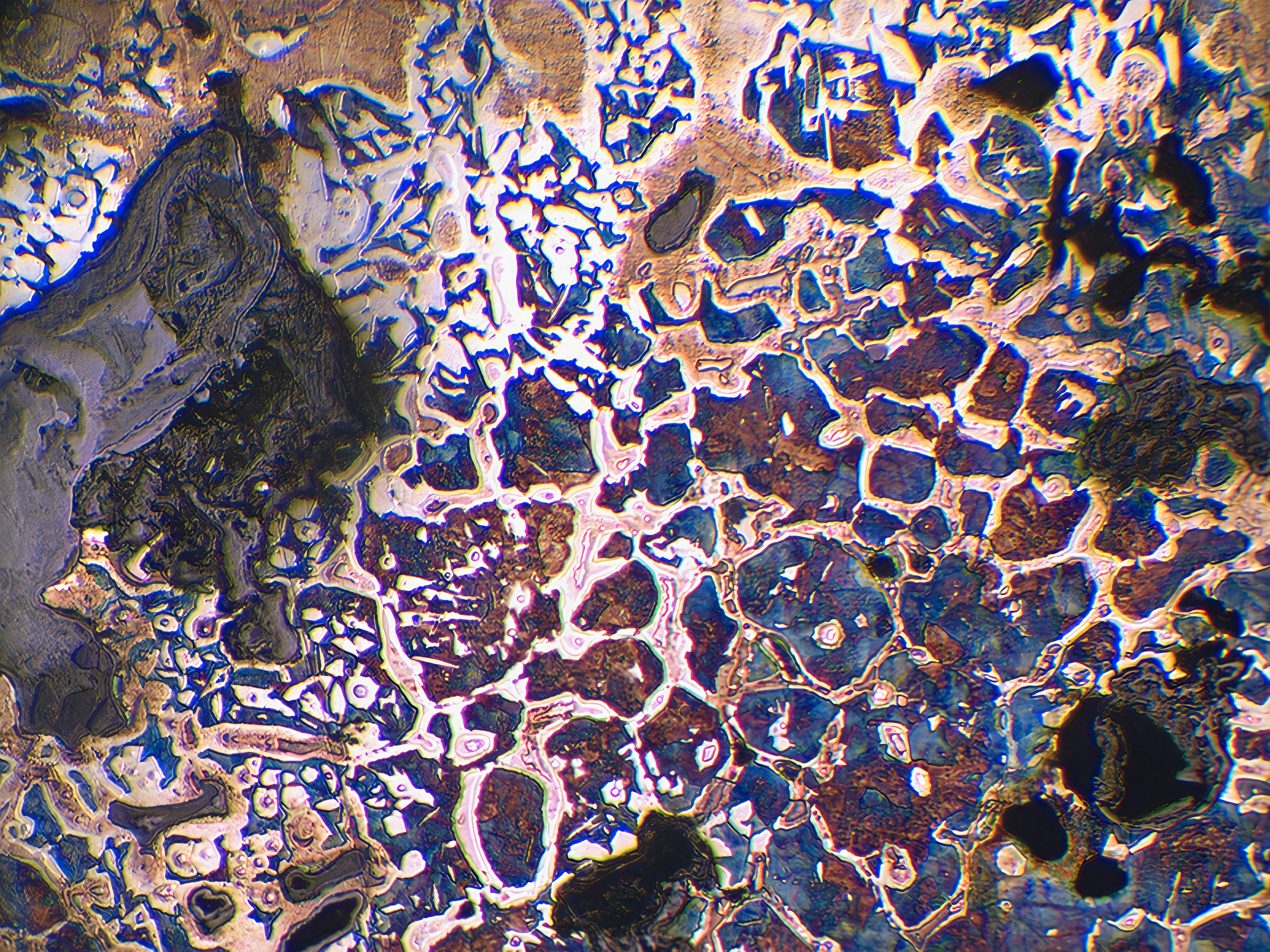
Hypereutectoid steel

A hypereutectic alloy also has different melting points. However, between these points, it is the constituent with the higher melting point that will be solid. Similarly, a hypereutectoid alloy has two critical temperatures. When cooling a hypereutectoid alloy from the upper transformation temperature, it will usually be the excess solutes that crystallize-out first, forming the pro-eutectoid. This continues until the concentration in the remaining alloy becomes eutectoid, which then crystallizes into a separate microstructure.

A hypereutectoid steel contains more than 0.77% carbon. When slowly cooling hypereutectoid steel, the cementite will begin to crystallize first. When the remaining steel becomes eutectoid in composition, it will crystallize into pearlite. Since cementite is much harder than pearlite, the alloy has greater hardenability at a cost in ductility.

== Effects of time and temperature ==
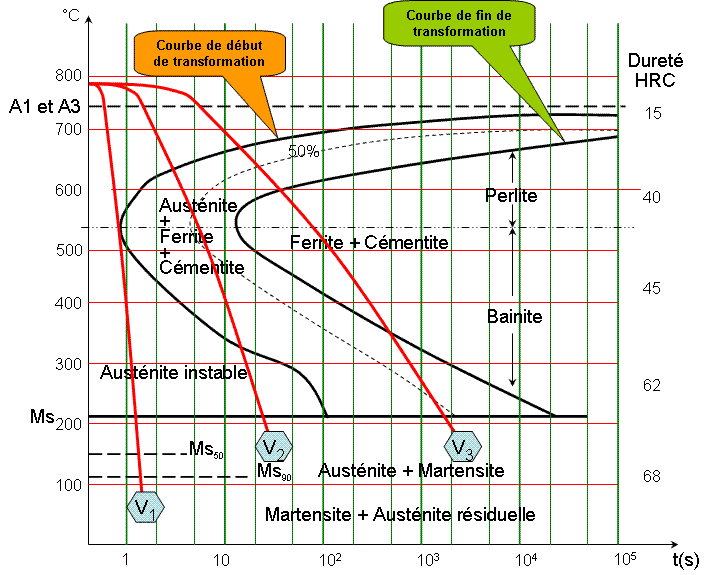
Time-temperature transformation (TTT) diagram for steel. The red curves represent different cooling rates (velocity) when cooled from the upper critical (A3) temperature. V1 (quenching) produces martensite. V2 (normalizing) produces both pearlite and martensite, V3 (annealing) produces bainite mixed with pearlite.

Proper heat treating requires precise control over temperature, time held at a certain temperature and cooling rate.

With the exception of stress-relieving, tempering, and aging, most heat treatments begin by heating an alloy beyond a certain transformation, or arrest (A), temperature. This temperature is referred to as an "arrest" because at the A temperature the metal experiences a period of hysteresis. At this point, all of the heat energy is used to cause the crystal change, so the temperature stops rising for a short time (arrests) and then continues climbing once the change is complete. Therefore, the alloy must be heated above the critical temperature for a transformation to occur. The alloy will usually be held at this temperature long enough for the heat to completely penetrate the alloy, thereby bringing it into a complete solid solution. Iron, for example, has four critical-temperatures, depending on carbon content. Pure iron in its alpha (room temperature) state changes to nonmagnetic gamma-iron at its A_{2} temperature, and weldable delta-iron at its A_{4} temperature. However, as carbon is added, becoming steel, the A_{2} temperature splits into the A_{3} temperature, also called the austenitizing temperature (all phases become austenite, a solution of gamma iron and carbon) and its A_{1} temperature (austenite changes into pearlite upon cooling). Between these upper and lower temperatures the pro eutectoid phase forms upon cooling.

Because a smaller grain size usually enhances mechanical properties, such as toughness, shear strength and tensile strength, these metals are often heated to a temperature that is just above the upper critical temperature, in order to prevent the grains of solution from growing too large. For instance, when steel is heated above the upper critical-temperature, small grains of austenite form. These grow larger as the temperature is increased. When cooled very quickly, during a martensite transformation, the austenite grain-size directly affects the martensitic grain-size. Larger grains have large grain-boundaries, which serve as weak spots in the structure. The grain size is usually controlled to reduce the probability of breakage.

The diffusion transformation is very time-dependent. Cooling a metal will usually suppress the precipitation to a much lower temperature. Austenite, for example, usually only exists above the upper critical temperature. However, if the austenite is cooled quickly enough, the transformation may be suppressed for hundreds of degrees below the lower critical temperature. Such austenite is highly unstable and, if given enough time, will precipitate into various microstructures of ferrite and cementite. The cooling rate can be used to control the rate of grain growth or can even be used to produce partially martensitic microstructures. However, the martensite transformation is time-independent. If the alloy is cooled to the martensite transformation (M_{s}) temperature before other microstructures can fully form, the transformation will usually occur at just under the speed of sound.

When austenite is cooled but kept above the martensite start temperature Ms so that a martensite transformation does not occur, the austenite grain size will have an effect on the rate of nucleation, but it is generally temperature and the rate of cooling that controls the grain size and microstructure. When austenite is cooled extremely slowly, it will form large ferrite crystals filled with spherical inclusions of cementite. This microstructure is referred to as "sphereoidite". If cooled a little faster, then coarse pearlite will form. Even faster, and fine pearlite will form. If cooled even faster, bainite will form, with more complete bainite transformation occurring depending on the time held above martensite start Ms. Similarly, these microstructures will also form, if cooled to a specific temperature and then held there for a certain time.

Most non-ferrous alloys are also heated in order to form a solution. Most often, these are then cooled very quickly to produce a martensite transformation, putting the solution into a supersaturated state. The alloy, being in a much softer state, may then be cold worked. This causes work hardening that increases the strength and hardness of the alloy. Moreover, the defects caused by plastic deformation tend to speed up precipitation, increasing the hardness beyond what is normal for the alloy. Even if not cold worked, the solutes in these alloys will usually precipitate, although the process may take much longer. Sometimes these metals are then heated to a temperature that is below the lower critical (A_{1}) temperature, preventing recrystallization, in order to speed-up the precipitation.

== Types of heat treatment ==
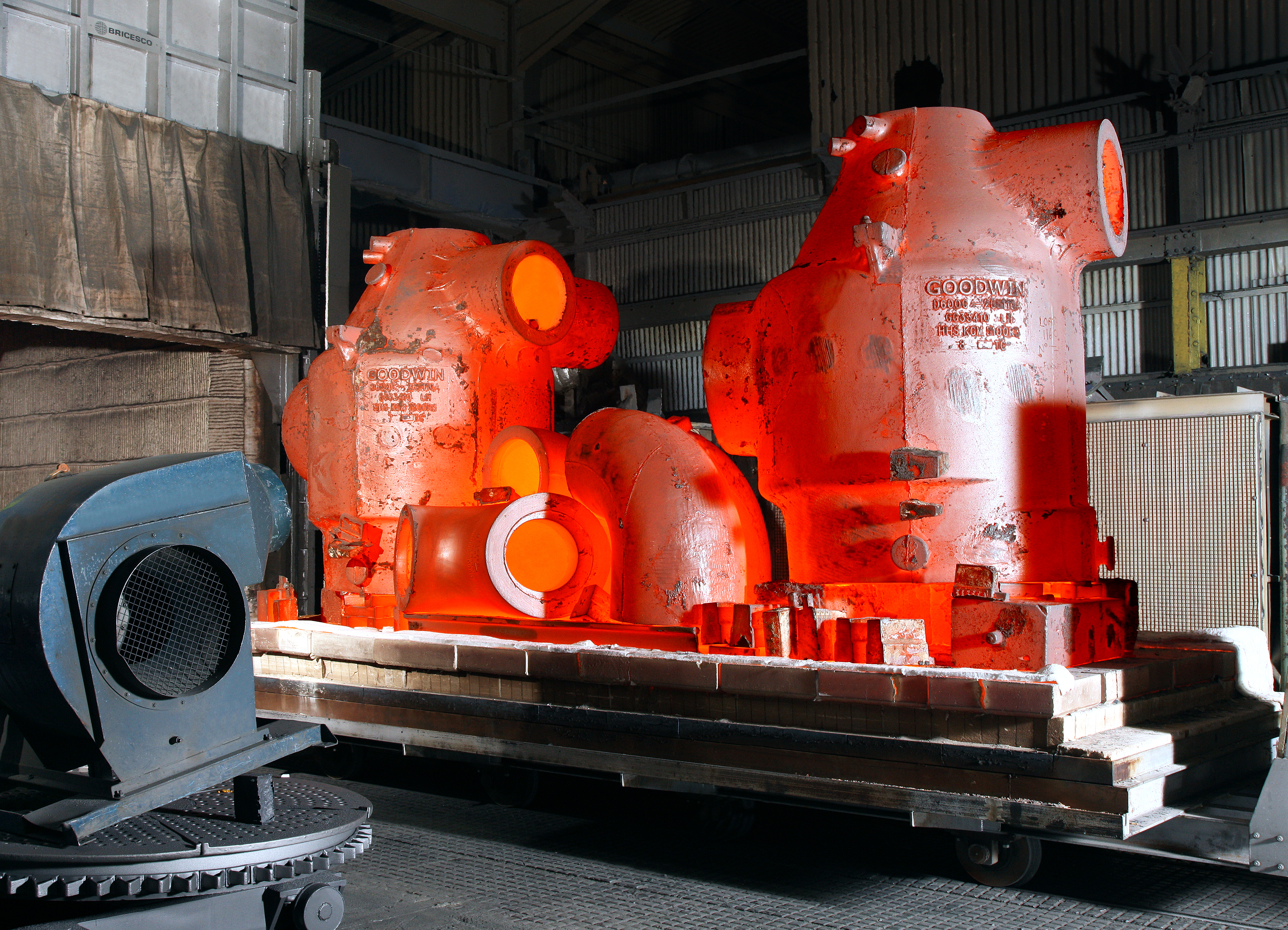
Steel castings after undergoing 12-hour 1,200 °C (2,190 °F) heat treatment.

Complex heat treating schedules, or "cycles", are often devised by metallurgists to optimize an alloy's mechanical properties. In the aerospace industry, a superalloy may undergo five or more different heat treating operations to develop the desired properties. This can lead to quality problems depending on the accuracy of the furnace's temperature controls and timer. These operations can usually be divided into several basic techniques.

=== Annealing ===
Annealing consists of heating a metal to a specific temperature and then cooling at a rate that will produce a refined microstructure, either fully or partially separating the constituents. The rate of cooling is generally slow. Annealing is most often used to soften a metal for cold working, to improve machinability, or to enhance properties like electrical conductivity.

In ferrous alloys, annealing is usually accomplished by heating the metal beyond the upper critical temperature and then cooling very slowly, resulting in the formation of pearlite. In both pure metals and many alloys that cannot be heat treated, annealing is used to remove the hardness caused by cold working. The metal is heated to a temperature where recrystallization can occur, thereby repairing the defects caused by plastic deformation. In these metals, the rate of cooling will usually have little effect. Most non-ferrous alloys that are heat-treatable are also annealed to relieve the hardness of cold working. These may be slowly cooled to allow full precipitation of the constituents and produce a refined microstructure.

Ferrous alloys are usually either "full annealed" or "process annealed". Full annealing requires very slow cooling rates, in order to form coarse pearlite. In process annealing, the cooling rate may be faster; up to, and including normalizing. The main goal of process annealing is to produce a uniform microstructure. Non-ferrous alloys are often subjected to a variety of annealing techniques, including "recrystallization annealing", "partial annealing", "full annealing", and "final annealing". Not all annealing techniques involve recrystallization, such as stress relieving.

=== Normalizing ===
Normalizing is a technique used to provide uniformity in grain size and composition (equiaxed crystals) throughout an alloy. The term is often used for ferrous alloys that have been austenitized and then cooled in the open air. Normalizing not only produces pearlite but also martensite and sometimes bainite, which gives harder and stronger steel but with less ductility for the same composition than full annealing.

In the normalizing process the steel is heated to about 40 degrees Celsius above its upper critical temperature limit, held at this temperature for some time, and then cooled in air.

=== Stress relieving ===
Stress-relieving is a technique to remove or reduce the internal stresses created in metal. These stresses may be caused in a number of ways, ranging from cold working to non-uniform cooling. Stress-relieving is usually accomplished by heating a metal below the lower critical temperature and then cooling uniformly. Stress relieving is commonly used on items like air tanks, boilers and other pressure vessels, to remove a portion of the stresses created during the welding process.

=== Aging ===
Some metals are classified as precipitation hardening metals. When a precipitation hardening alloy is quenched, its alloying elements will be trapped in solution, resulting in a soft metal. Aging a "solutionized" metal will allow the alloying elements to diffuse through the microstructure and form intermetallic particles. These intermetallic particles will nucleate and fall out of the solution and act as a reinforcing phase, thereby increasing the strength of the alloy. Alloys may age " naturally" meaning that the precipitates form at room temperature, or they may age "artificially" when precipitates only form at elevated temperatures. In some applications, naturally aging alloys may be stored in a freezer to prevent hardening until after further operations - assembly of rivets, for example, maybe easier with a softer part.

Examples of precipitation hardening alloys include 2000 series, 6000 series, and 7000 series aluminium alloy, as well as some superalloys and some stainless steels. Steels that harden by aging are typically referred to as maraging steels, from a combination of the term "martensite aging".

=== Quenching ===
Quenching is a process of cooling a metal at a rapid rate. This is most often done to produce a martensite transformation. In ferrous alloys, this will often produce a harder metal, while non-ferrous alloys will usually become softer than normal.

To harden by quenching, a metal (usually steel or cast iron) must be heated above the upper critical temperature (Steel: above 815~900 degrees Celsius) and then quickly cooled. Depending on the alloy and other considerations (such as concern for maximum hardness vs. cracking and distortion), cooling may be done with forced air or other gases, (such as nitrogen). Liquids may be used, due to their better thermal conductivity, such as oil, water, a polymer dissolved in water, or a brine. Upon being rapidly cooled, a portion of austenite (dependent on alloy composition) will transform to martensite, a hard, brittle crystalline structure. The quenched hardness of a metal depends on its chemical composition and quenching method. Cooling speeds, from fastest to slowest, go from brine, polymer (i.e. mixtures of water + glycol polymers), freshwater, oil, and forced air. However, quenching certain steel too fast can result in cracking, which is why high-tensile steels such as AISI 4140 should be quenched in oil, tool steels such as ISO 1.2767 or H13 hot work tool steel should be quenched in forced air, and low alloy or medium-tensile steels such as XK1320 or AISI 1040 should be quenched in brine.

Some Beta titanium based alloys have also shown similar trends of increased strength through rapid cooling. However, most non-ferrous metals, like alloys of copper, aluminum, or nickel, and some high alloy steels such as austenitic stainless steel (304, 316), produce an opposite effect when these are quenched: they soften. Austenitic stainless steels must be quenched to become fully corrosion resistant, as they work-harden significantly.

=== Tempering ===
Untempered martensitic steel, while very hard, is too brittle to be useful for most applications. A method for alleviating this problem is called tempering. Most applications require that quenched parts be tempered. Tempering consists of heating steel below the lower critical temperature, (often from 400˚F to 1105˚F or 205˚C to 595˚C, depending on the desired results), to impart some toughness. Higher tempering temperatures (maybe up to 1,300˚F or 700˚C, depending on the alloy and application) are sometimes used to impart further ductility, although some yield strength is lost.

Tempering may also be performed on normalized steels. Other methods of tempering consist of quenching to a specific temperature, which is above the martensite start temperature, and then holding it there until pure bainite can form or internal stresses can be relieved. These include austempering and martempering.

==== Tempering colors ====
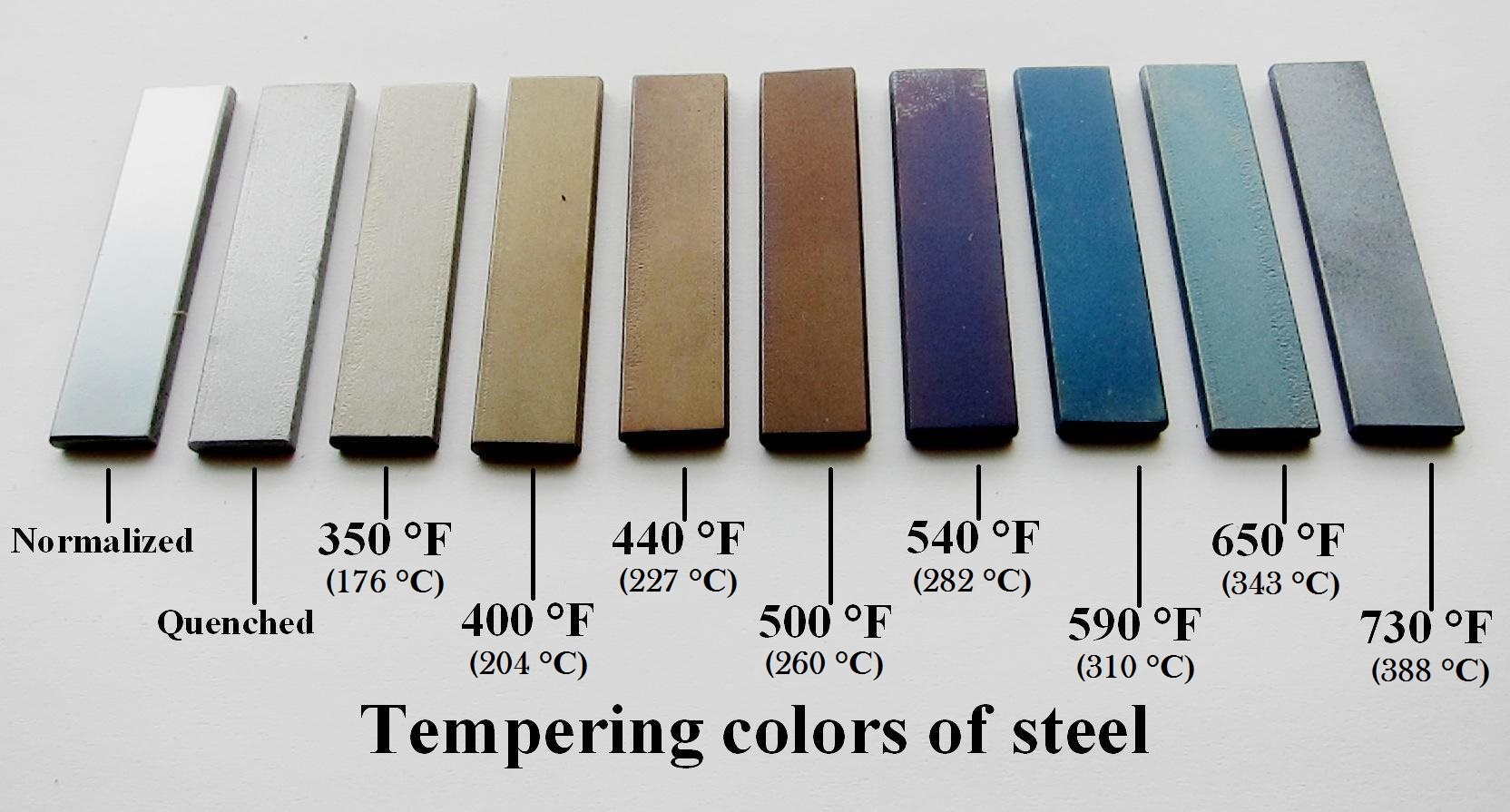
Tempering colors of steel

Steel that has been freshly ground or polished will form oxide layers when heated. At a very specific temperature, the iron oxide will form a layer with a very specific thickness, causing thin-film interference. This causes colors to appear on the surface of the steel. As the temperature is increased, the iron oxide layer grows in thickness, changing the color. These colors, called tempering colors, have been used for centuries to gauge the temperature of the metal.

- 350˚F (176˚C), light yellowish
- 400˚F (204˚C), light-straw
- 440˚F (226˚C), dark-straw
- 500˚F (260˚C), brown
- 540˚F (282˚C), purple
- 590˚F (310˚C), deep blue
- 640˚F (337˚C), light blue

The tempering colors can be used to judge the final properties of the tempered steel. Very hard tools are often tempered in the light to the dark straw range, whereas springs are often tempered to the blue. However, the final hardness of the tempered steel will vary, depending on the composition of the steel. Higher-carbon tool steel will remain much harder after tempering than spring steel (of slightly less carbon) when tempered at the same temperature. The oxide film will also increase in thickness over time. Therefore, steel that has been held at 400˚F for a very long time may turn brown or purple, even though the temperature never exceeded that needed to produce a light straw color. Other factors affecting the final outcome are oil films on the surface and the type of heat source used.

=== Selective heat treating ===
Many heat treating methods have been developed to alter the properties of only a portion of an object. These tend to consist of either cooling different areas of an alloy at different rates, by quickly heating in a localized area and then quenching, by thermochemical diffusion, or by tempering different areas of an object at different temperatures, such as in differential tempering.

==== Differential hardening ====
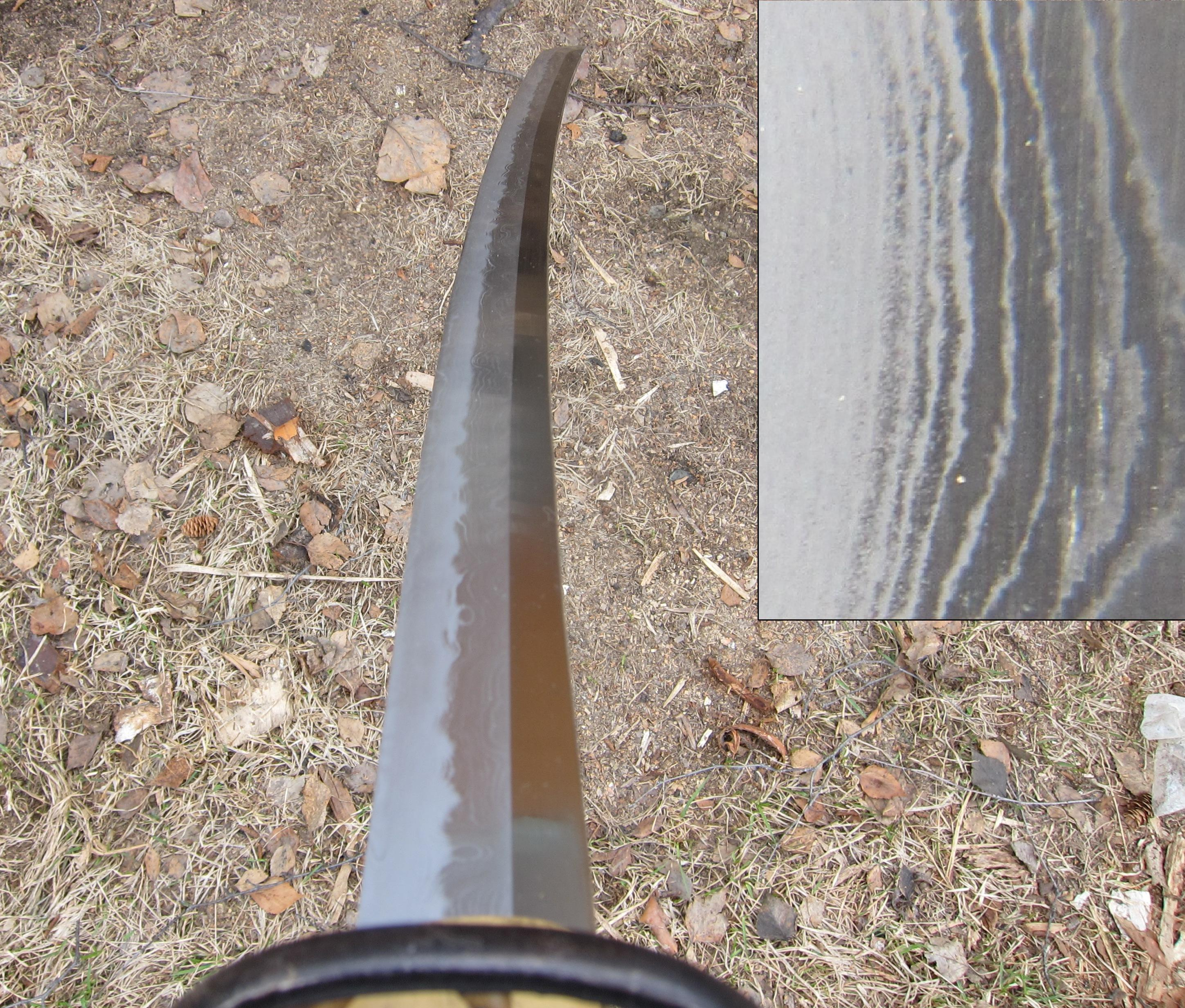
A differentially hardened katana. The bright, wavy line following the hamon, called the nioi, separates the martensitic edge from the pearlitic back. The inset shows a close-up of the nioi, which is made up of individual martensite grains (niye) surrounded by pearlite. The wood-grain appearance comes from layers of different compositions.

Some techniques allow different areas of a single object to receive different heat treatments. This is called differential hardening. It is common in high quality knives and swords. The Chinese jian is one of the earliest known examples of this, and the Japanese katana may be the most widely known. The Nepalese Khukuri is another example. This technique uses an insulating layer, like layers of clay, to cover the areas that are to remain soft. The areas to be hardened are left exposed, allowing only certain parts of the steel to fully harden when quenched.

==== Flame hardening ====
Flame hardening is used to harden only a portion of the metal. Unlike differential hardening, where the entire piece is heated and then cooled at different rates, in flame hardening, only a portion of the metal is heated before quenching. This is usually easier than differential hardening, but often produces an extremely brittle zone between the heated metal and the unheated metal, as cooling at the edge of this heat-affected zone is extremely rapid.

==== Induction hardening ====
Induction hardening is a surface hardening technique in which the surface of the metal is heated very quickly, using a no-contact method of induction heating. The alloy is then quenched, producing a martensite transformation at the surface while leaving the underlying metal unchanged. This creates a very hard, wear-resistant surface while maintaining the proper toughness in the majority of the object. Crankshaft journals are a good example of an induction hardened surface.

==== Case hardening ====
Case hardening is a thermochemical diffusion process in which an alloying element, most commonly carbon or nitrogen, diffuses into the surface of a monolithic metal. The resulting interstitial solid solution is harder than the base material, which improves wear resistance without sacrificing toughness.

Laser surface engineering is a surface treatment with high versatility, selectivity and novel properties. Since the cooling rate is very high in laser treatment, metastable even metallic glass can be obtained by this method.

=== Cold and cryogenic treating ===
Although quenching steel causes the austenite to transform into martensite, all of the austenite usually does not transform. Some austenite crystals will remain unchanged even after quenching below the martensite finish (M_{f}) temperature. Further transformation of the austenite into martensite can be induced by slowly cooling the metal to extremely low temperatures. Cold treating generally consists of cooling the steel to around -115˚F (-81˚C), but does not eliminate all of the austenite. Cryogenic treating usually consists of cooling to much lower temperatures, often in the range of -315˚F (-192˚C), to transform most of the austenite into martensite.

Cold and cryogenic treatments are typically done immediately after quenching, before any tempering, and will increase the hardness, wear resistance, and reduce the internal stresses in the metal but, because it is really an extension of the quenching process, it may increase the chances of cracking during the procedure. The process is often used for tools, bearings, or other items that require good wear resistance. However, it is usually only effective in high-carbon or high-alloy steels in which more than 10% austenite is retained after quenching.

=== Decarburization ===
The heating of steel is sometimes used as a method to alter the carbon content. When steel is heated in an oxidizing environment, the oxygen combines with the iron to form an iron-oxide layer, which protects the steel from decarburization. When the steel turns to austenite, however, the oxygen combines with iron to form a slag, which provides no protection from decarburization. The formation of slag and scale actually increases decarburization, because the iron oxide keeps oxygen in contact with the decarburization zone even after the steel is moved into an oxygen-free environment, such as the coals of a forge. Thus, the carbon atoms begin combining with the surrounding scale and slag to form both carbon monoxide and carbon dioxide, which is released into the air.

Steel contains a relatively small percentage of carbon, which can migrate freely within the gamma iron. When austenitized steel is exposed to air for long periods of time, the carbon content in the steel can be lowered. This is the opposite from what happens when steel is heated in a reducing environment, in which carbon slowly diffuses further into the metal. In an oxidizing environment, the carbon can readily diffuse outwardly, so austenitized steel is very susceptible to decarburization. This is often used for cast steel, where a high carbon content is needed for casting, but a lower carbon content is desired in the finished product. It is often used on cast iron to produce malleable cast iron, in a process called "white tempering". This tendency to decarburize is often a problem in other operations, such as blacksmithing, where it becomes more desirable to austenitize the steel for the shortest amount of time possible to prevent too much decarburization.

== Specification of heat treatment ==
Usually the end condition is specified instead of the process used in heat treatment.

=== Case hardening ===
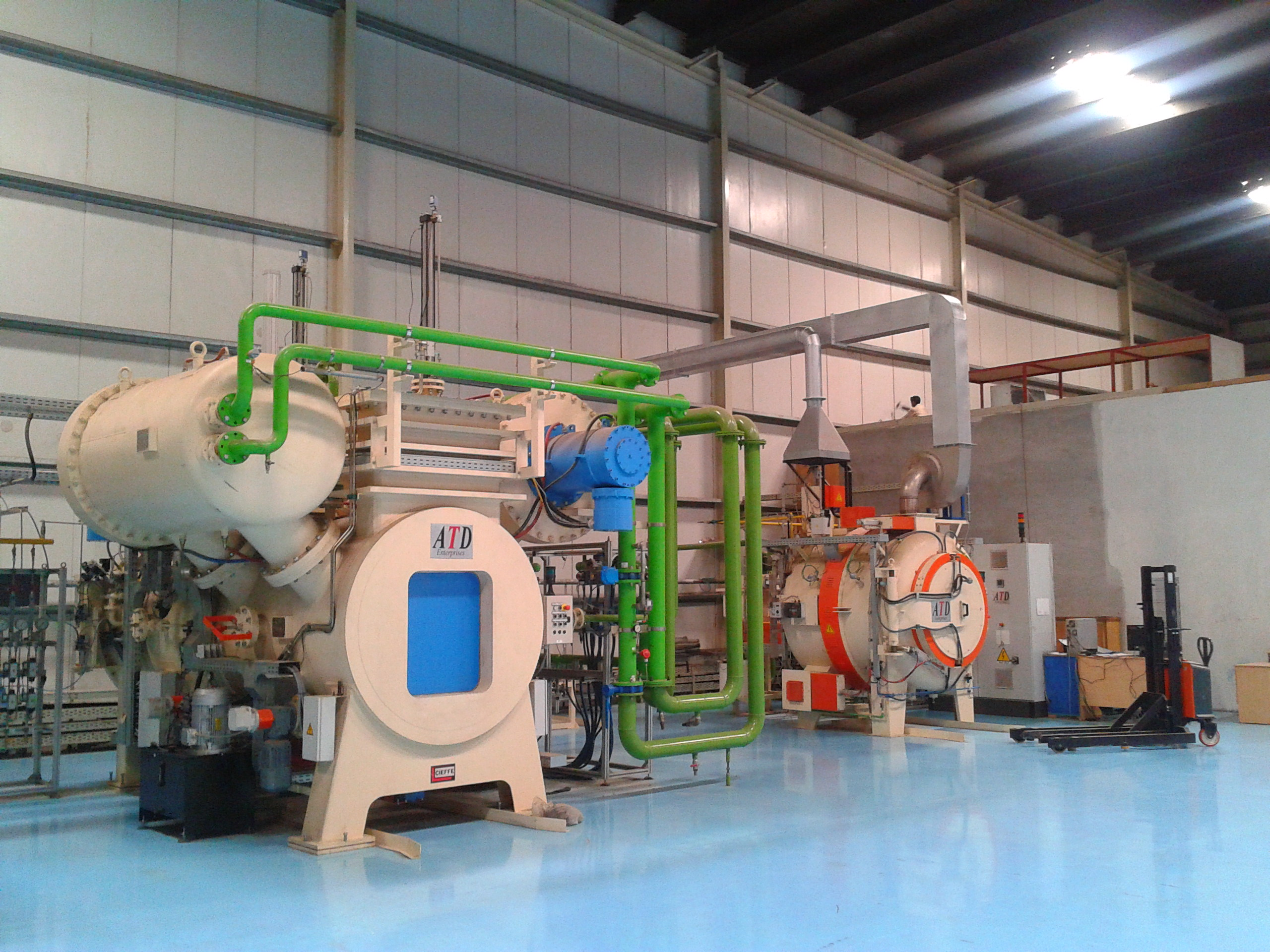
A modern, fully computerised case hardening furnace.

Case hardening is specified by "hardness" and "case depth". The case depth can be specified in two ways: total case depth or effective case depth. The total case depth is the true depth of the case. For most alloys, the effective case depth is the depth of the case that has a hardness equivalent of HRC50; however, some alloys specify a different hardness (40-60 HRC) at effective case depth; this is checked on a Tukon microhardness tester. This value can be roughly approximated as 65% of the total case depth; however, the chemical composition and hardenability can affect this approximation. If neither type of case depth is specified the total case depth is assumed.

For case hardened parts the specification should have a tolerance of at least ±0.005 in (0.13 mm). If the part is to be ground after heat treatment, the case depth is assumed to be after grinding.

The Rockwell hardness scale used for the specification depends on the depth of the total case depth, as shown in the table below. Usually, hardness is measured on the Rockwell "C" scale, but the load used on the scale will penetrate through the case if the case is less than 0.030 in (0.76 mm). Using Rockwell "C" for a thinner case will result in a false reading.

Rockwell scale required for various case depths
Total case depth, min. [in]	Rockwell scale
0.030	C
0.024	A
0.021	45 N
0.018	30 N
0.015	15 N
Less than 0.015	"File hard"

For cases that are less than 0.015 in (0.38 mm) thick a Rockwell scale cannot reliably be used, so file hard is specified instead. File hard is approximately equivalent to 58 HRC.

When specifying the hardness either a range should be given or the minimum hardness specified. If a range is specified at least 5 points should be given.

=== Through hardening ===
Only hardness is listed for through hardening. It is usually in the form of HRC with at least a five-point range.

=== Annealing ===
The hardness for an annealing process is usually listed on the HRB scale as a maximum value. It is a process to refine grain size, improve strength, remove residual stress, and affect the electromagnetic properties...

== Types of furnaces ==
Furnaces used for heat treatment can be split into two broad categories: batch furnaces and continuous furnaces. Batch furnaces are usually manually loaded and unloaded, whereas continuous furnaces have an automatic conveying system to provide a constant load into the furnace chamber.

=== Batch furnaces ===
Batch systems usually consist of an insulated chamber with a steel shell, a heating system, and an access door to the chamber.

=== Box-type furnace ===
Many basic box-type furnaces have been upgraded to a semi-continuous batch furnace with the addition of integrated quench tanks and slow-cool chambers. These upgraded furnaces are a very commonly used piece of equipment for heat-treating.

=== Car-type furnace ===
Also known as a " bogie hearth", the car furnace is an extremely large batch furnace. The floor is constructed as an insulated movable car that is moved in and out of the furnace for loading and unloading. The car is usually sealed using sand seals or solid seals when in position. Due to the difficulty in getting a sufficient seal, car furnaces are usually used for non-atmosphere processes.

=== Elevator-type furnace ===
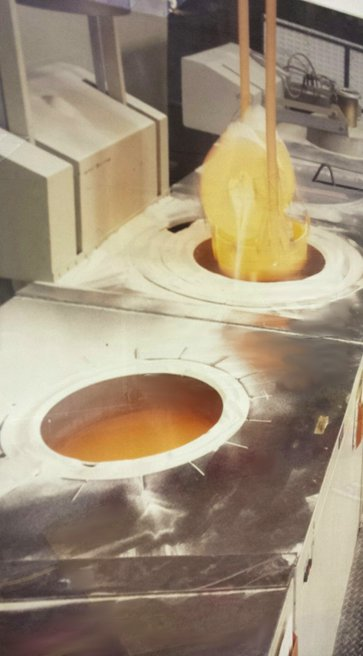
Fluidised bed heat treatment line

Similar in type to the car furnace, except that the car and hearth are rolled into position beneath the furnace and raised by means of a motor-driven mechanism, elevator furnaces can handle large heavy loads and often eliminate the need for any external cranes and transfer mechanisms.

=== Bell-type furnace ===
Bell furnaces have removable covers called bells, which are lowered over the load and hearth by crane. An inner bell is placed over the hearth and sealed to supply a protective atmosphere. An outer bell is lowered to provide the heat supply.

=== Pit furnaces ===
Furnaces that are constructed in a pit and extend to floor level or slightly above are called pit furnaces. Workpieces can be suspended from fixtures, held in baskets, or placed on bases in the furnace. Pit furnaces are suited to heating long tubes, shafts, and rods by holding them in a vertical position. This manner of loading provides minimal distortion.

=== Salt bath furnaces ===
Salt baths are used in a wide variety of heat treatment processes including neutral hardening, liquid carburising, liquid nitriding, austempering, martempering and tempering.

Parts are loaded into a pot of molten salt where they are heated by conduction, giving a very readily available source of heat. The core temperature of a part rises in temperature at approximately the same rate as its surface in a salt bath.

Salt baths utilize a variety of salts for heat treatment, with cyanide salts being the most extensively used. Concerns about associated occupation health and safety, and expensive waste management and disposal due to their environmental effects have made the use of salt baths less attractive in recent years. Consequently, many salt baths are being replaced by more environmentally friendly fluidized bed furnaces.

=== Fluidised bed furnaces ===
A fluidised bed consists of a cylindrical retort made from high-temperature alloy, filled with sand-like aluminum oxide particulate. Gas (air or nitrogen) is bubbled through the oxide and the sand moves in such a way that it exhibits fluid-like behavior, hence the term fluidized. The solid-solid contact of the oxide gives very high thermal conductivity and excellent temperature uniformity throughout the furnace, comparable to those seen in a salt bath.

== See also ==
- Carbon steel
- Carbonizing
- Diffusion hardening
- Induction hardening
- Retrogression heat treatment
- Nitriding
