= Carbon steel =

Steel in which the main interstitial alloying constituent is carbon

Carbon steel (US) or non-alloy steel (Europe) is a steel with carbon content from about 0.05 up to 2.1 percent by weight. The definition of carbon steel from the American Iron and Steel Institute (AISI) states:

- no minimum content is specified or required for chromium, cobalt, molybdenum, nickel, niobium, titanium, tungsten, vanadium, zirconium, or any other element to be added to obtain a desired alloying effect, or
- the specified minimum for copper does not exceed 0.40%, or
- the maximum content specified for any of the following elements does not exceed the percentages noted: manganese 1.65%, silicon 0.60%, copper 0.60%.

The addition of significant amounts of other metals, such as nickel, chromium, vanadium, molybdenum, changes the materials definition from carbon steel to alloy steel.

As the carbon content percentage rises, steel has the ability to become harder and stronger through heat treating; however, it becomes less ductile. Regardless of the heat treatment, a higher carbon content reduces weldability. In carbon steels, the higher carbon content lowers the melting point.

High-carbon steel has many uses, primarily applications where medium strength and low material cost are factors, including: high strength steel wires, springs, bolts, garden and agricultural tools, wood chisels and axes.

== Properties ==
Carbon steel is often divided into two main categories: low-carbon steel and high-carbon steel. It may also contain other elements, such as manganese, phosphorus, sulfur, and silicon, which can affect its properties. Low-carbon steel can be easily machined and welded, making it versatile and suitable for various applications which require reasonable strength and low material cost such as car body panels, footbridges, hand rails, garden furniture/park benches, nails, gates etc . Higher carbon is less easily machined and is much less suitable for welding, but can be heat treated to improve its strength, hardness, and durability.

Carbon steel is susceptible to rust and corrosion, especially in environments with high moisture levels and/or salt. It can be shielded from corrosion by coating it with paint, varnish, or other protective material. Alternatively, it can be made from a stainless steel alloy that contains chromium, which provides excellent corrosion resistance. Carbon steel can be alloyed with other elements to improve its properties, such as by adding chromium and/or nickel to improve its resistance to corrosion and oxidation or adding molybdenum to improve its strength and toughness at high temperatures.

== Type ==
=== Mild or low-carbon steel ===
Mild steel (iron containing a small percentage of carbon, strong and tough but not readily tempered), also known as plain-carbon steel and low-carbon steel, is now the most common form of steel because its price is relatively low while it provides material properties that are acceptable for many applications. Mild steel contains approximately 0.05–0.30% carbon making it malleable and ductile. Mild steel has a relatively low tensile strength, but it is cheap and easy to form. Surface hardness can be increased with carburization.

The density of mild steel is approximately 7.85 g/cm^{3} (7,850 kg/m^{3}; 0.284 lb/cu in) and the Young's modulus is 200 GPa (29×10^{6} psi).

Low-carbon steels display yield-point runout where the material has two yield points. The first yield point (or upper yield point) is higher than the second and the yield drops dramatically after the upper yield point. If a low-carbon steel is only stressed to some point between the upper and lower yield point then the surface develops Lüder bands. Low-carbon steels contain less carbon than other steels and are easier to cold-form, making them easier to handle. Typical applications of low-carbon steel are car parts, pipes, construction, and food cans.

==== High-tensile steel ====
Steels which have a carbon content above ~0.3% can have their hardness and tensile strength modified by heat treatment. Heating to approximately 850°C followed by rapid cooling/quenching in water or oil increases hardness and tensile strength, but it also reduces maleability, increases brittleness and make fractures and breakages much more likely. To reduce these brittleness problems whilst still achieving high levels of hardness and tensile strength, low or medium carbon steels are alloyed with other metals. These alloy steels also require specific heat treatment to achieve the required mechanical properties, and the tensile strength/hardness trade off vs malleability remains, but to a much lesser extent compared to low alloy carbon steel. Alloying ingredients include chromium, molybdenum, silicon, manganese, nickel, and vanadium. The relative scarcity and high cost of these metals compared to iron is primarily what restricts their use.

- 41xx steel
  - 4140 steel
  - 4145 steel
- 4340 steel
  - 300M steel
- EN25 steel – 2.521% nickel-chromium-molybdenum steel
- EN26 steel

=== Higher-carbon steels ===
Carbon steels which can successfully undergo heat-treatment have a carbon content in the range of 0.30–1.70% by weight. Trace impurities of various other elements can significantly affect the quality of the resulting steel. Trace amounts of sulfur in particular make the steel red-short, that is, brittle and crumbly at high working temperatures. Low-alloy carbon steel, such as A36 grade, contains about 0.05% sulfur and melt around 1,426–1,538 °C (2,600–2,800 °F). Manganese is often added to improve the hardenability of low-carbon steels. These additions turn the material into a low-alloy steel by some definitions, but AISI's definition of carbon steel allows up to 1.65% manganese by weight. There are two types of higher carbon steels which are high-carbon steel and the ultra high-carbon steel. The reason for the limited use of high-carbon steel is that it has extremely poor ductility and weldability and has a higher cost of production. The applications best suited for the high-carbon steels is its use in the spring industry, farm industry, and in the production of wide range of high-strength wires.

== Classification ==
Different classifications of non-alloy steel exist.

=== American AISI/SAE standard ===
Carbon steel is broken down into four classes based on carbon content:

- Low-carbon steel has 0.05 to 0.15% carbon (plain carbon steel) content.
- Medium-carbon steel has approximately 0.3–0.5% carbon content. It balances ductility and strength and has good wear resistance. It is used for large parts, forging and automotive components.
- High-carbon steels, for example 1075 (C75) and 1095 alloys, have approximately 0.6 to 1.0% carbon content. These steels are very strong, and are used for such products as springs, edged tools, and high-strength wires.
- Ultra-high-carbon steels have approximately 1.25–2.0% carbon content. D2 steel with a content of 1.5% carbon falls into this category. UHC steels can be tempered to great hardness, and are used for special purposes such as (non-industrial-purpose) knives, axles, and punches. Most steels with more than 2.5% carbon content are made using powder metallurgy.

=== EN10020 ===
EN 10020 categorizes non-alloy steels into two main groups:

- Non-alloy quality steels: These are the most common type of non-alloy steels used for general structural purposes and are widely available. Their properties are guaranteed, but with broader tolerances than special steels. Examples include structural steels like S235, S275, and S355, which are defined in the EN 10025 standard.
- Non-alloy special steels: These steels are made to a higher level of purity and have a more precisely controlled chemical composition. They're designed for applications that require consistent, specific properties, often achieved through heat treatments like quenching and tempering. An example would be steels used for machine parts or gears.

== Heat treatment ==
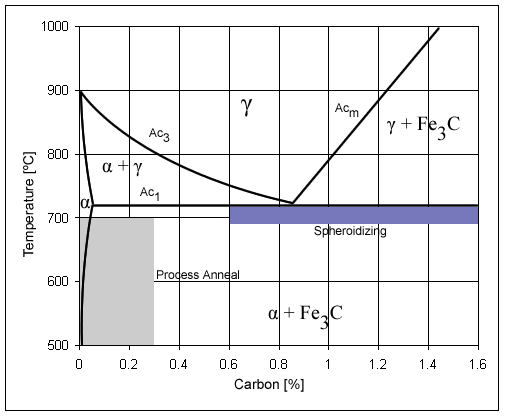
Iron-carbon phase diagram, showing the temperature and carbon ranges for certain types of heat treatments

The purpose of heat treating carbon steel is to change the mechanical properties of steel, usually ductility, hardness, yield strength, or impact resistance. Note that the electrical and thermal conductivity are only slightly altered. As with most strengthening techniques for steel, Young's modulus (elasticity) is unaffected. All treatments of steel trade ductility for increased strength and vice versa. Iron has a higher solubility for carbon in the austenite phase; therefore all heat treatments, except spheroidizing and process annealing, start by heating the steel to a temperature at which the austenitic phase can exist. The steel is then quenched (heat drawn out) at a moderate to low rate allowing carbon to diffuse out of the austenite forming iron-carbide (cementite) and leaving ferrite, or at a high rate, trapping the carbon within the iron thus forming martensite. The rate at which the steel is cooled through the eutectoid temperature (about 727 °C or 1,341 °F) affects the rate at which carbon diffuses out of austenite and forms cementite. Generally speaking, cooling swiftly will leave iron carbide finely dispersed and produce a fine grained pearlite and cooling slowly will give a coarser pearlite. Cooling a hypoeutectoid steel (less than 0.77 wt% C) results in a lamellar-pearlitic structure of iron carbide layers with α-ferrite (nearly pure iron) between. If it is hypereutectoid steel (more than 0.77 wt% C) then the structure is full pearlite with small grains (larger than the pearlite lamella) of cementite formed on the grain boundaries. A eutectoid steel (0.77% carbon) will have a pearlite structure throughout the grains with no cementite at the boundaries. The relative amounts of constituents are found using the lever rule. The following is a list of the types of heat treatments possible:

Spheroidizing
Spheroidite forms when carbon steel is heated to approximately 700 °C (1,300 °F) for over 30 hours. Spheroidite can form at lower temperatures but the time needed drastically increases, as this is a diffusion-controlled process. The result is a structure of rods or spheres of cementite within primary structure (ferrite or pearlite, depending on which side of the eutectoid you are on). The purpose is to soften higher carbon steels and allow more formability. This is the softest and most ductile form of steel.
Full annealing
A hypoeutectoid carbon steel (carbon composition smaller than the eutectoid one) is heated to approximately 30 to 50 °C (54 to 90 °F) above the austenictic temperature (A_{3}), whereas a hypereutectoid steel is heated to a temperature above the eutectoid one (A_{1}) for a certain number of hours; this ensures all the ferrite transforms into austenite (although cementite might still exist in hypereutectoid steels). The steel must then be cooled slowly, in the realm of 20 °C (36 °F) per hour. Usually it is just furnace cooled, where the furnace is turned off with the steel still inside. This results in a coarse pearlitic structure, which means the "bands" of pearlite are thick. Fully annealed steel is soft and ductile, with no internal stresses, which is often necessary for cost-effective forming. Only spheroidized steel is softer and more ductile.
Process annealing
A process used to relieve stress in a cold-worked carbon steel with less than 0.3% C. The steel is usually heated to 550 to 650 °C (1,000 to 1,200 °F) for 1 hour, but sometimes temperatures as high as 700 °C (1,300 °F). The image above shows the process annealing area.
Isothermal annealing
It is a process in which hypoeutectoid steel is heated above the upper critical temperature. This temperature is maintained for a time and then reduced to below the lower critical temperature and is again maintained. It is then cooled to room temperature. This method eliminates any temperature gradient.
Normalizing
Carbon steel is heated to the austenitic region, ensuring the steel completely transforms to austenite, and then slow cooling in air. Normalizing steel is most often done to refine the grain structure, increase the strength relative to annealed steel, and/or to provide more uniform internal structure.
Quenching
Carbon steel with at least 0.4 wt% C is heated to normalizing temperatures and then rapidly cooled (quenched) in water, brine, or oil to the critical temperature. The critical temperature is dependent on the carbon content, but as a general rule is lower as the carbon content increases. This results in a martensitic structure; a form of steel that possesses a super-saturated carbon content in a deformed body-centered cubic (BCC) crystalline structure, properly termed body-centered tetragonal (BCT), with much internal stress. Thus quenched steel is extremely hard but brittle, usually too brittle for practical purposes. These internal stresses may cause stress cracks on the surface. Quenched steel is approximately three times harder (four with more carbon) than normalized steel.
Martempering (marquenching)
Martempering is not actually a tempering procedure, hence the term marquenching. It is a form of isothermal heat treatment applied after an initial quench, typically in a molten salt bath, at a temperature just above the "martensite start temperature". At this temperature, residual stresses within the material are relieved and some bainite may be formed from the retained austenite which did not have time to transform into anything else. In industry, this is a process used to control the ductility and hardness of a material. With longer marquenching, the ductility increases with a minimal loss in strength; the steel is held in this solution until the inner and outer temperatures of the part equalize. Then the steel is cooled at a moderate speed to keep the temperature gradient minimal. Not only does this process reduce internal stresses and stress cracks, but it also increases impact resistance.
Tempering
This is the most common heat treatment encountered because the final properties can be precisely determined by the temperature and time of the tempering. Tempering involves reheating quenched steel to a temperature below the eutectoid temperature and then cooling. The elevated temperature allows very small amounts spheroidite to form, which restores ductility but reduces hardness. Actual temperatures and times are carefully chosen for each composition.
Austempering
The austempering process is the same as martempering, except the quench is interrupted and the steel is held in the molten salt bath at temperatures between 205 and 540 °C (400 and 1,000 °F), and then cooled at a moderate rate. The resulting steel, called bainite, produces an acicular microstructure in the steel that has great strength (but less than martensite), greater ductility, higher impact resistance, and less distortion than martensite steel. The disadvantage of austempering is it can be used only on a few sheets of steel, and it requires a special salt bath.

== Case hardening ==
Case hardening processes harden only the exterior of the steel part, creating a hard, wear-resistant skin (the "case") but preserving a tough and ductile interior. Carbon steels are not very hardenable meaning they can not be hardened throughout thick sections. Alloy steels have a better hardenability, so they can be through-hardened and do not require case hardening. This property of carbon steel can be beneficial, because it gives the surface good wear characteristics but leaves the core flexible and shock-absorbing.

== Forging temperature of steel ==
Steel type	Maximum forging temperature		Burning temperature	
Steel type	(°F)	(°C)	(°F)	(°C)
1.5% carbon	1,920	1,049	2,080	1,140
1.1% carbon	1,980	1,082	2,140	1,171
0.9% carbon	2,050	1,121	2,230	1,221
0.5% carbon	2,280	1,249	2,460	1,349
0.2% carbon	2,410	1,321	2,680	1,471
3.0% nickel steel	2,280	1,249	2,500	1,371
3.0% nickel–chromium steel	2,280	1,249	2,500	1,371
5.0% nickel (case-hardening) steel	2,320	1,271	2,640	1,449
Chromium–vanadium steel	2,280	1,249	2,460	1,349
High-speed steel	2,370	1,299	2,520	1,385
Stainless steel	2,340	1,282	2,520	1,385
Austenitic chromium–nickel steel	2,370	1,299	2,590	1,420
Silico-manganese spring steel	2,280	1,249	2,460	1,350

== See also ==
- Aermet
- Cold working
- Eglin steel (a low-cost precipitation-hardened high-strength steel)
- Forging
- Hot working
- Maraging steel (precipitation-hardened high-strength steels)
- Welding (high-strength steels)

== Bibliography ==
- DeGarmo, E. Paul; Black, J T.; Kohser, Ronald A. (2003), Materials and Processes in Manufacturing (9th ed.), Wiley, ISBN 0-471-65653-4.
- Oberg, E.; et al. (1996), Machinery's Handbook (25th ed.), Industrial Press Inc, ISBN 0-8311-2599-3.
- Smith, William F.; Hashemi, Javad (2006), Foundations of Materials Science and Engineering (4th ed.), McGraw-Hill, ISBN 0-07-295358-6.
