= RHT =

RHT may refer to:

- Stock symbol for Red Hat Inc.
- IATA code for Alxa Right Banner Badanjilin Airport, Inner Mongolia, China
- Retinohypothalamic tract
- Right-hand traffic
- Randomized Hough transform, in image processing
- Retrogression heat treatment, in metals processing
- Right hand thread, in mechanics
