= Austempering =

Heat treatment in ferrous materials

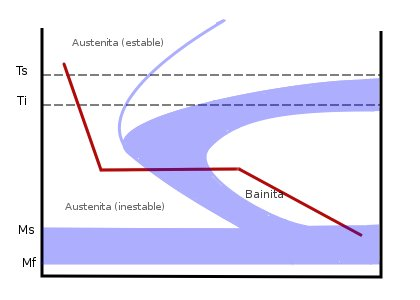
Time-temperature transformation (TTT) diagram. The red line shows the cooling curve for austempering.

Austempering is heat treatment that is applied to ferrous metals, most notably steel and ductile iron. In steel it produces a bainite microstructure whereas in cast irons it produces a structure of acicular ferrite and high-carbon-stabilized austenite known as ausferrite. It is primarily used to improve mechanical properties or reduce / eliminate distortion. Austempering is defined by both the process and the resultant microstructure. Typical austempering process parameters applied to an unsuitable material will not result in the formation of bainite or ausferrite and thus the final product will not be called austempered. Both microstructures may also be produced via other methods. For example, they may be produced as-cast or air cooled with the proper alloy content. These materials are also not referred to as austempered.

== History ==
The austempering of steel was first pioneered in the 1930s by Edgar C. Bain and Edmund S. Davenport, who were working for the United States Steel Corporation at that time. Bainite must have been present in steels long before its acknowledged discovery date, but was not identified because of the limited metallographic techniques available and the mixed microstructures formed by the heat treatment practices of the time. Coincidental circumstances inspired Bain to study isothermal phase transformations. Austenite and the higher temperature phases of steel were becoming more and more understood and it was already known that austenite could be retained at room temperature. Through his contacts at the American Steel and Wire Company, Bain was aware of isothermal transformations being used in industry and he began to conceive new experiments

Further research into the isothermal transformation of steels was a result of Bain and Davenport's discovery of a new microstructure consisting of an "acicular, dark etching aggregate." This microstructure was found to be "tougher for the same hardness than tempered Martensite". Commercial exploitation of bainitic steel was not rapid. Common heat-treating practices at the time featured continuous cooling methods and were not capable, in practice, of producing fully bainitic microstructures. The range of alloys available produced either mixed microstructures or excessive amounts of Martensite. The advent of low-carbon steels containing boron and molybdenum in 1958 allowed fully bainitic steel to be produced by continuous cooling. Commercial use of bainitic steel thus came about as a result of the development of new heat-treating methods, with those that involve a step in which the workpiece is held at a fixed temperature for a period of time sufficient to allow transformation becoming collectively known as austempering.

One of the first uses of austempered steel was in rifle bolts during World War II. The high impact strength possible at high hardnesses, and the relatively small section size of the components made austempered steel ideal for this application. Over subsequent decades austempering revolutionized the spring industry followed by clips and clamps. These components, which are usually thin, formed parts, do not require expensive alloys and generally possess better elastic properties than their tempered Martensite counterparts. Eventually austempered steel made its way into the automotive industry, where one of its first uses was in safety critical components. The majority of car seat brackets and seat belt components are made of austempered steel because of its high strength and ductility. These properties allow it to absorb more energy during a crash without the risk of brittle failure. Currently, austempered steel is also used in bearings, mower blades, transmission gear, wave plate, and turf aeration tines. In the second half of the 20th century the austempering process began to be applied commercially to cast irons. Austempered ductile iron (ADI) was first commercialized in the early 1970s and has since become a major industry.

== Process ==
The most notable difference between austempering and conventional quench and tempering is that it involves holding the workpiece at the quenching temperature for an extended period of time. The basic steps are the same whether applied to cast iron or steel and are as follows:

=== Austenitizing ===
In order for any transformation to take place, the microstructure of the metal must be austenite structure. The exact boundaries of the austenite phase region depend on the chemistry of the alloy being heat treated. However, austenitizing temperatures are typically between 790 and 915 °C (1,454 and 1,679 °F). The amount of time spent at this temperature will vary with the alloy and process specifics for a through-hardened part. The best results are achieved when austenitization is long enough to produce a fully austenitic metal microstructure (there will still be graphite present in cast irons) with a consistent carbon content. In steels this may take only a few minutes after the austenitizing temperature has been reached throughout the part section, but in cast irons it takes longer. This is because carbon must diffuse out of the graphite until it has reached the equilibrium concentration dictated by the temperature and the phase diagram. This step may be done in many types of furnaces, in a high-temperature salt bath, or via direct flame or induction heating. Numerous patents describe specific methods and variations.

=== Quenching ===
As with conventional quench and tempering the material being heat treated must be cooled from the austenitizing temperature quickly enough to avoid the formation of pearlite. The specific cooling rate that is necessary to avoid the formation of pearlite is a product of the chemistry of the austenite phase and thus the alloy being processed. The actual cooling rate is a product of both the quench severity, which is influenced by quench media, agitation, load (quenchant ratio, etc.), and the thickness and geometry of the part. As a result, heavier section components required greater hardenability. In austempering the heat treat load is quenched to a temperature which is typically above the Martensite start of the austenite and held. In some patented processes the parts are quenched just below the Martensite start so that the resulting microstructure is a controlled mixture of Martensite and Bainite.

The two important aspects of quenching are the cooling rate and the holding time. The most common practice is to quench into a bath of liquid nitrite-nitrate salt and hold in the bath. Because of the restricted temperature range for processing it is not usually possible to quench in water or brine, but high temperature oils are used for a narrow temperature range. Some processes feature quenching and then removal from the quench media, then holding in a furnace. The quench and holding temperature are primary processing parameters that control the final hardness, and thus properties of the material.

=== Cooling ===
After quenching and holding there is no danger of cracking; parts are typically air cooled or put directly into a room temperature wash system.

=== Tempering ===
No tempering is required after austempering if the part is through hardened and fully transformed to either Bainite or ausferrite. Tempering adds another stage and thus cost to the process; it does not provide the same property modification and stress relief in Bainite or ausferrite that it does for virgin Martensite.

== Advantages ==
Austempering offers many manufacturing and performance advantages over conventional material/process combinations. It may be applied to numerous materials, and each combination has its own advantages, which are listed below. One of the advantages that is common to all austempered materials is a lower rate of distortion than for quenching and tempering. This can be translated into cost savings by adjustment of the entire manufacturing process. The most immediate cost savings are realized by machining before heat treatment. There are many such savings possible in the specific case of converting a quench-and-tempered steel component to austempered ductile iron (ADI). Ductile iron is 10% less dense than steel and can be cast near to net shape, both characteristics that reduce the casting weight. Near-net-shape casting also further reduces the machining cost, which is already reduced by machining soft ductile iron instead of hardened steel. A lighter finished part reduces freight charges and the streamlined production flow often reduces lead time. In many cases strength and wear resistance can also be improved.

Process/material combinations include:

- Austempered steel
- Carbo-austempered steel
- Marbain steel
- Austempered ductile iron (ADI)
- Locally austempered ductile iron (LADI)
- Austempered gray iron (AGI)
- Carbidic austempered ductile iron (CADI)
- Intercritically Austempered Steel
- Intercritically Austempered Ductile Iron

With respect to performance improvements, austempered materials are typically compared to conventionally quench-and-tempered materials with a tempered Martensite microstructure.

In steels above 40 Rc these improvements include:

- Higher ductility, impact strength and wear resistance for a given hardness,
- A low-distortion, repeatable dimensional response,
- Increased fatigue strength,
- Resistance to hydrogen and environmental embrittlement.

In cast irons (from 250-550 HBW) these improvements include:

- Higher ductility and impact resistance for a given hardness,
- A low-distortion, repeatable dimensional response,
- Increased fatigue strength,
- Increased wear resistance for a given hardness.
