= Retrogression heat treatment =

Retrogression heat treatment (RHT) is a heat treatment process that rapidly heat treats age-hardenable aluminum alloys. Mainly induction heating is used for RHT. In the past, it was mainly used for 6061 and 6063 aluminum alloys. Therefore, forming of complex shapes is possible, without creating damages like cracks. Even hard tempers (for example -T6) can be formed easily after subjecting these alloys to RHT.
