= Allotropes of iron =

Different forms of the element iron

Low-pressure phase diagram of pure iron. BCC is body centered cubic and FCC is face-centered cubic.

Iron-carbon eutectic phase diagram, showing various forms of Fe_{x}C_{y} substances.

Iron allotropes, showing the differences in structure. The alpha iron (α-Fe) is a body-centered cubic (BCC) and the gamma iron (γ-Fe) is a face-centered cubic (FCC).

At atmospheric pressure, three allotropic forms of iron exist, depending on temperature: alpha iron (α-Fe, ferrite), gamma iron (γ-Fe, austenite), and delta iron (δ-Fe, similar to alpha iron). At very high pressure, a fourth form exists, epsilon iron (ε-Fe, hexaferrum). Some controversial experimental evidence suggests the existence of a fifth form that is stable at very high pressures and temperatures.

The phases of iron at atmospheric pressure are important because of the differences in solubility of carbon, forming different types of steel. The high-pressure phases of iron are important as models for the solid parts of planetary cores. The inner core of the Earth is generally assumed to consist essentially of a crystalline iron-nickel alloy with ε structure. The outer core surrounding the solid inner core is believed to be composed of liquid iron mixed with nickel and trace amounts of lighter elements.

== Standard pressure allotropes ==
=== Alpha iron (α-Fe) ===
Below 912 °C (1,674 °F), iron has a body-centered cubic (bcc) crystal structure and is known as α-iron or ferrite. It is thermodynamically stable and a fairly soft metal. α-Fe can be subjected to pressures up to ca. 15 GPa before transforming into a high-pressure form termed ε-Fe, discussed below.

Magnetically, α-iron is paramagnetic at high temperatures. However, below its Curie temperature (T_{C} or A_{2}) of 771 °C (1044K or 1420 °F), it becomes ferromagnetic. In the past, the paramagnetic form of α-iron was known as beta iron (β-Fe). Even though the slight tetragonal distortion in the ferromagnetic state does constitute a true phase transition, the continuous nature of this transition results in only minor importance in steel heat treating. The A_{2} line forms the boundary between the beta iron and alpha fields in the phase diagram in Figure 1.

Similarly, the A_{2} boundary is of only minor importance compared to the A_{1} (eutectoid), A_{3} and A_{cm} critical temperatures. The A_{cm}, where austenite is in equilibrium with cementite + γ-Fe, is beyond the right edge in Fig. 1. The α + γ phase field is, technically, the β + γ field above the A_{2}. The beta designation maintains continuity of the Greek-letter progression of phases in iron and steel: α-Fe, β-Fe, austenite (γ-Fe), high-temperature δ-Fe, and high-pressure hexaferrum (ε-Fe).

Molar volume vs. pressure for α-Fe at room temperature.

The primary phase of low-carbon or mild steel and most cast irons at room temperature is ferromagnetic α-Fe. It has a hardness of approximately 80 Brinell. The maximum solubility of carbon is about 0.02 wt% at 727 °C (1,341 °F) and 0.001% at 0 °C (32 °F). When it dissolves in iron, carbon atoms occupy interstitial "holes". Being about twice the diameter of the tetrahedral hole, the carbon introduces a strong local strain field.

Mild steel (carbon steel with up to about 0.2 wt% C) consists mostly of α-Fe and increasing amounts of cementite (Fe_{3}C, an iron carbide). The mixture adopts a lamellar structure called pearlite. Since bainite and pearlite each contain α-Fe as a component, any iron-carbon alloy will contain some amount of α-Fe if it is allowed to reach equilibrium at room temperature. The amount of α-Fe depends on the cooling process.

==== A_{2} critical temperature and induction heating ====
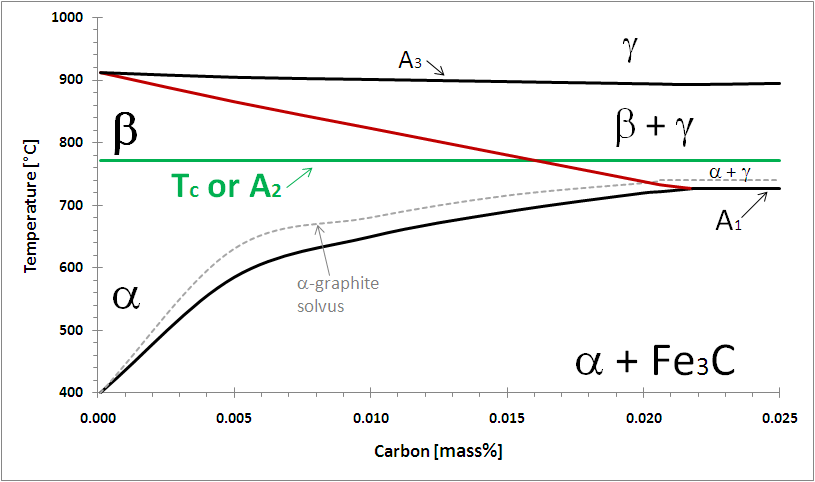
Figure 1: The beta field and A_{2} critical temperature on the iron-rich side of the iron-carbon phase diagram.

β-Fe and the A_{2} critical temperature are important in induction heating of steel, such as for surface-hardening heat treatments. Steel is typically austenitized at 900–1000 °C before it is quenched and tempered. The high-frequency alternating magnetic field of induction heating heats the steel by two mechanisms below the Curie temperature: resistance or Joule heating and ferromagnetic hysteresis losses. Above the A_{2} boundary, the hysteresis mechanism disappears and the required amount of energy per degree of temperature increase is thus substantially larger than below A_{2}. Load-matching circuits may be needed to vary the impedance in the induction power source to compensate for the change.

=== Gamma iron (γ-Fe) ===
When heating iron above 912 °C (1,674 °F), its crystal structure changes to a face-centered cubic (fcc) crystalline structure. In this form it is called gamma iron (γ-Fe) or austenite. γ-iron can dissolve considerably more carbon (as much as 2.04% by mass at 1,146 °C). This γ form of carbon saturation is exhibited in austenitic stainless steel.

=== Delta iron (δ-Fe) ===
Peculiarly, above 1,394 °C (2,541 °F), iron changes back into the bcc structure, known as δ-Fe. δ-iron can dissolve as much as 0.08% of carbon by mass at 1,475 °C. It is stable up to its melting point of 1,538 °C (2,800 °F). δ-Fe cannot exist above 5.2 GPa, with austenite instead transitioning directly to a molten phase at these high pressures.

== High pressure allotropes ==
=== Epsilon iron / Hexaferrum (ε-Fe) ===
At pressures above approximately 10–13 GPa and temperatures up to around 700 K, α-iron changes into a hexagonal close-packed (hcp) structure, which is also known as ε-iron or hexaferrum; the higher-temperature γ-phase also changes into ε-iron, but generally requires far higher pressures as temperature increases. The triple point of hexaferrum, ferrite, and austenite is 10.5 GPa at 750 K. Antiferromagnetism in alloys of epsilon-Fe with Mn, Os and Ru has been observed.

=== Experimental high temperature and pressure ===
An alternate stable form, if it exists, may appear at pressures of at least 50 GPa and temperatures of at least 1,500 K; it has been thought to have an orthorhombic or a double hcp structure. As of December 2011, recent and ongoing experiments are being conducted on high-pressure and superdense carbon allotropes.

== Phase transitions ==
=== Melting and boiling points ===
The melting point of iron is experimentally well defined for pressures less than 50 GPa.

For greater pressures, published data (as of 2007) put the γ-ε-liquid triple point at pressures that differ by tens of gigapascals and 1000 K in the melting point. Generally speaking, molecular dynamics computer simulations of iron melting and shock wave experiments suggest higher melting points and a much steeper slope of the melting curve than static experiments carried out in diamond anvil cells.

The melting and boiling points of iron, along with its enthalpy of atomization, are lower than those of the earlier group 3d elements from scandium to chromium, showing the lessened contribution of the 3d electrons to metallic bonding as they are attracted more and more into the inert core by the nucleus; however, they are higher than the values for the previous element manganese because that element has a half-filled 3d subshell and consequently its d-electrons are not easily delocalized. This same trend appears for ruthenium but not osmium.

=== Structural phase transitions ===
The exact temperatures at which iron will transition from one crystal structure to another depends on how much and what type of other elements are dissolved in the iron. The phase boundary between the different solid phases is drawn on a binary phase diagram, usually plotted as temperature versus percent iron. Adding some elements, such as Chromium, narrows the temperature range for the gamma phase, while others increase the temperature range of the gamma phase. In elements that reduce the gamma phase range, the alpha-gamma phase boundary connects with the gamma-delta phase boundary, forming what is usually called the Gamma loop. Adding Gamma loop additives keeps the iron in a body-centered cubic structure and prevents the steel from suffering phase transition to other solid states.

== See also ==
- Tempering (metallurgy)
