= Bainite =

Plate-like microstructure in steels

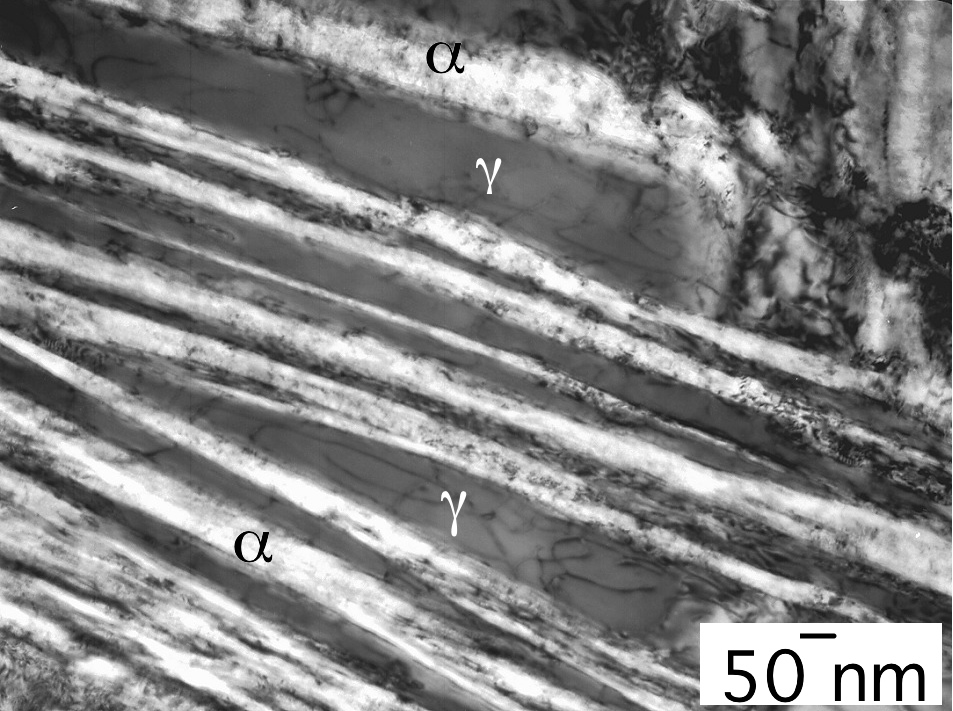
Bainite in steel with composition Fe–0.98C–1.46Si–1.89Mn–0.26Mo–1.26Cr–0.09V wt%, which was transformed at 200 °C for 15 days

Bainite is a plate-like microstructure that forms in steels at temperatures of 125–550 °C (depending on alloy content). First described by E. S. Davenport and Edgar Bain, it is one of the products that may form when austenite (the face-centered cubic crystal structure of iron) is cooled past a temperature where it is no longer thermodynamically stable with respect to ferrite, cementite, or ferrite and cementite. Davenport and Bain originally described the microstructure as similar in appearance to tempered martensite.

A fine non-lamellar structure, bainite commonly consists of cementite and dislocation-rich ferrite. The large density of dislocations in the ferrite present in bainite, and the fine size of the bainite platelets, makes this ferrite harder than it normally would be.

The temperature range for transformation of austenite to bainite (125–550 °C) is between those for pearlite and martensite. In fact, there is no fundamental lower limit to the bainite-start temperature. When formed during continuous cooling, the cooling rate to form bainite is more rapid than that required to form pearlite, but less rapid than is required to form martensite (in steels of the same composition). Most alloying elements will retard the formation of bainite, though carbon is the most effective in doing so. Aluminium or cobalt are exceptions in that they can accelerate the decomposition of austenite and raise the transformation temperature.

The microstructures of martensite and bainite at first seem quite similar, consisting of thin plates which in low-alloy steels cluster together. This is a consequence of the two microstructures sharing many aspects of their transformation mechanisms. However, morphological differences do exist that require a transmission electron microscope to see. Under a light microscope, the microstructure of bainite appears darker than untempered martensite because the bainite has more substructure.

The hardness of bainite can be between that of pearlite and untempered martensite in the same steel hardness. The fact that it can be produced during both isothermal or continuous cooling is a big advantage, because this facilitates the production of large components without excessive additions of alloying elements. Unlike martensitic steels, alloys based on bainite often do not need further heat treatment after transformation in order to optimise strength and toughness.

== History ==
In the 1920s Davenport and Bain discovered a new steel microstructure that they provisionally called martensite-troostite, because it is intermediate between the known low-temperature martensite phase and what was then known as troostite (later fine-pearlite). This microstructure was subsequently named bainite by Bain's colleagues at the United States Steel Corporation, although it took some time for the name to be taken up by the scientific community with books as late as 1947 failing to mention bainite by name.

Bain and Davenport also noted the existence of two distinct forms: 'upper-range' bainite which formed at higher temperatures and 'lower-range' bainite which formed near the martensite start temperature (these forms are now known as upper- and lower-bainite respectively). The early terminology was further confused by the overlap, in some alloys, of the lower-range of the pearlite reaction and the upper-range of the bainite with the additional possibility of proeutectoid ferrite.

== Formation ==
Illustration of a continuous cooling transformation (cct) diagram for a steel alloy

Above approximately 900 °C a typical low-carbon steel is composed entirely of austenite, a high-temperature phase of iron that has a cubic close-packed crystal structure. On cooling, it tends to transform into a mixture of phases, ferrite and cementite, depending on the exact chemical composition. A steel of eutectoid composition will under equilibrium conditions transform into pearlite – an interleaved mixture of ferrite and cementite (Fe_{3}C). In addition to the thermodynamic considerations indicated by the phase diagram, the phase transformations in steel are heavily influenced by the chemical kinetics. This is because the diffusion of iron atoms becomes difficult below about 600 °C under typical processing conditions. As a consequence, a complex array of microstructures occurs when the atomic mobility is limited. This leads to the complexity of steel microstructures which are strongly influenced by the cooling rate. This can be illustrated by a continuous cooling transformation (CCT) diagram which plots the time required to form a phase when a sample is cooled at a specific rate thus showing regions in time-temperature space from which the expected phase fractions can be deduced for a given thermal cycle.

If the steel is cooled slowly or isothermally transformed at elevated temperatures, the microstructure obtained will be closer to equilibrium, containing for example of allotriomorphic ferrite, cementite and pearlite. However, the transformation from austenite to pearlite is a time-dependent reconstructive reaction which requires the large scale movement of the iron and carbon atoms. While the interstitial carbon diffuses readily even at moderate temperatures the self-diffusion of iron becomes extremely slow at temperatures below 600 °C until, for all practical purposes, it stops. As a consequence, a rapidly cooled steel may reach a temperature where pearlite can no longer form even though the reaction is incomplete and the remaining austenite is thermodynamically unstable.

Austenite that is cooled sufficiently rapidly to avoid higher temperature transformations, can form martensite, without any diffusion of either iron or carbon, by the deformation of the austenite's face-centred crystal structure into a distorted body-centred tetragonal or body-centred cubic structure. This non-equilibrium phase can only form at low temperatures, where the driving force for the reaction is sufficient to overcome the considerable lattice strain imposed by the transformation. The transformation is essentially time-independent with the phase fraction depending only the degree of cooling below the critical martensite start temperature. Further, it occurs without the diffusion of either substitutional or interstitial atoms and so martensite inherits the composition of the parent austenite.

Bainite occupies a region between these two process in a temperature range where iron self-diffusion is limited but there is insufficient driving force to form martensite. The bainite, like martensite, grows without diffusion but some of the carbon then partitions into any residual austenite, or precipitates as cementite. A further distinction is often made between so-called lower-bainite, which forms at temperatures closer to the martensite start temperature, and upper-bainite which forms at higher temperatures. This distinction arises from the diffusion rates of carbon at the temperature at which the bainite is forming. If the temperature is high then the carbon will diffuse rapidly away from the newly formed ferrite and form carbides in the carbon-enriched residual austenite between the ferritic plates leaving them carbide-free. At low temperatures the carbon will diffuse more sluggishly and may precipitate before it can leave the bainitic ferrite. There is some controversy over the specifics of bainite's transformation mechanism; both theories are represented below.

=== Displacive theory ===
One of the theories on the specific formation mechanism for bainite is that it occurs by a shear transformation, as in martensite. The crystal structure change is achieved by a deformation rather than by diffusion. The shape change associated with bainite is an invariant—plane strain with a large shear component. This kind of deformation implies a disciplined motion of atoms (rather than a chaotic transfer associated with diffusion), and is typical of all displacive transformations in steels, for example, martensite, bainite and Widmanstaetten ferrite. There is a strain energy associated with such relief, that leads to the plate shape of the transformation product Any diffusion is subsequent to the diffusionless transformation of austenite, for example the partitioning of carbon from supersaturated bainitic ferrite, or the precipitation of carbides; this is analogous to the tempering of martensite.

There are many features of bainite that are correctly predicted by this theory, including:

- the plate shape, which is a consequence of the minimisation of strain energy due to the shape deformation accompanying transformation.
- The fact that excess carbon is retained inside the even defect-free regions of bainitic ferrite.
- The fact that the unit cell of bainitic ferrite can be tetragonal rather than cubic.
- The fact that the bainite transformation can be dramatically retarded when the austenite is first plastically deformed, a phenomenon known as mechanical stabilisation, which is unique to displacive transformations.
- The obvious fact that displacements occur when bainite grows. The transformation is a combination of deformation and crystal structure change, just like martensite.

=== Diffusive theory ===
The diffusive theory of bainite's transformation process is based on the assumption that a bainitic ferrite plate grows with a similar mechanism as Widmanstätten ferrite at higher temperatures. Its growth rate thus depends on how rapidly carbon can diffuse from the growing ferrite into the austenite. A common misconception is that this mechanism excludes the possibility of coherent interfaces and a surface relief. In fact it is accepted by some that formation of Widmanstätten ferrite is controlled by carbon diffusion and do show a similar surface relief.

=== Morphology ===
Typically bainite manifests as aggregates, termed sheaves, of ferrite plates (sub-units) separated by retained austenite, martensite or cementite. While the sub-units appear separate when viewed on a 2-dimensional section they are in fact interconnected in 3-dimensions and usually take on a lenticular plate or lath morphology. The sheaves themselves are wedge-shaped with the thicker end associated with the nucleation site.

The thickness of the ferritic plates is found to increase with the transformation temperature. Neural network models have indicated that this is not a direct effect of the temperature per se but rather a result of the temperature dependence of the driving force for the reaction and the strength of the austenite surrounding the plates. At higher temperatures, and hence lower undercooling, the reduced thermodynamic driving force causes a decrease in the nucleation rate which allows individual plates to grow larger before they physically impinge on each other. Further, the growth of the plates must be accommodated by plastic flow in the surrounding austenite which is difficult if the austenite is strong and resists the plate's growth.

=== Upper bainite ===
"Upper bainite" forms around 400–550 °C in sheaves. These sheaves contain several laths of ferrite that are approximately parallel to each other and which exhibit a Kurdjumov-Sachs relationship with the surrounding austenite, though this relationship degrades as the transformation temperature is lowered. The ferrite in these sheaves has a carbon concentration below 0.03%, resulting in carbon-rich austenite around the laths.

The amount of cementite that forms between the laths is based on the carbon content of the steel. For a low carbon steel, typically discontinuous "stringers" or small particles of cementite will be present between laths. For steel with a higher carbon content, the stringers become continuous along the length of the adjacent laths.

=== Lower bainite ===
Lower bainite forms between 250 and 400 °C and takes a more plate-like form than upper bainite. There are not nearly as many low angle boundaries between laths in lower bainite. In lower bainite, the habit plane in ferrite will also shift from <111> towards <110> as transformation temperature decreases. In lower bainite, cementite nucleates on the interface between ferrite and austenite.

=== Incomplete transformation ===
In the present context, "incomplete transformation" refers to the fact that in the absence of carbide precipitation, the bainite reaction stops well before the austenite reaches its equilibrium or paraequilibrium chemical composition. It stops at the point where the free energies of austenite and ferrite of identical composition become the same, i.e. transformation without a change in chemical composition of the participating phases becomes thermodynamically impossible.

Early research on bainite found that at a given temperature only a certain volume fraction of the austenite would transform to bainite with the remainder decomposing to pearlite after an extended delay. This was the case despite the fact that a complete austenite to pearlite transformation could be achieved at higher temperatures where the austenite was more stable. The fraction of bainite that could form increased as the temperature decreased. This was ultimately explained by accounting for the fact that when the bainitic ferrite formed the supersaturated carbon would be expelled to the surrounding austenite thus thermodynamically stabilising it against further transformation.

=== Difference between martensite and bainite ===
Bainite can essentially be regarded as martensite that tempers during the course of transformation. It forms at a higher temperature than martensite, and even the latter can autotemper. Because the transformation temperature is higher, the austenite itself is mechanically weak so that the shape deformation due to bainite is relaxed by the plastic deformation of the adjacent austenite. As a consequence, the growing plate of bainite is confronted by a forest of dislocations that eventually terminates its growth even before the plate has hit an austenite grain boundary. Plates of bainite can therefore be smaller than those of martensite in the same steel. The transformation then proceeds by a sub-unit mechanism involving the successive nucleation of new plates.

== Applications ==
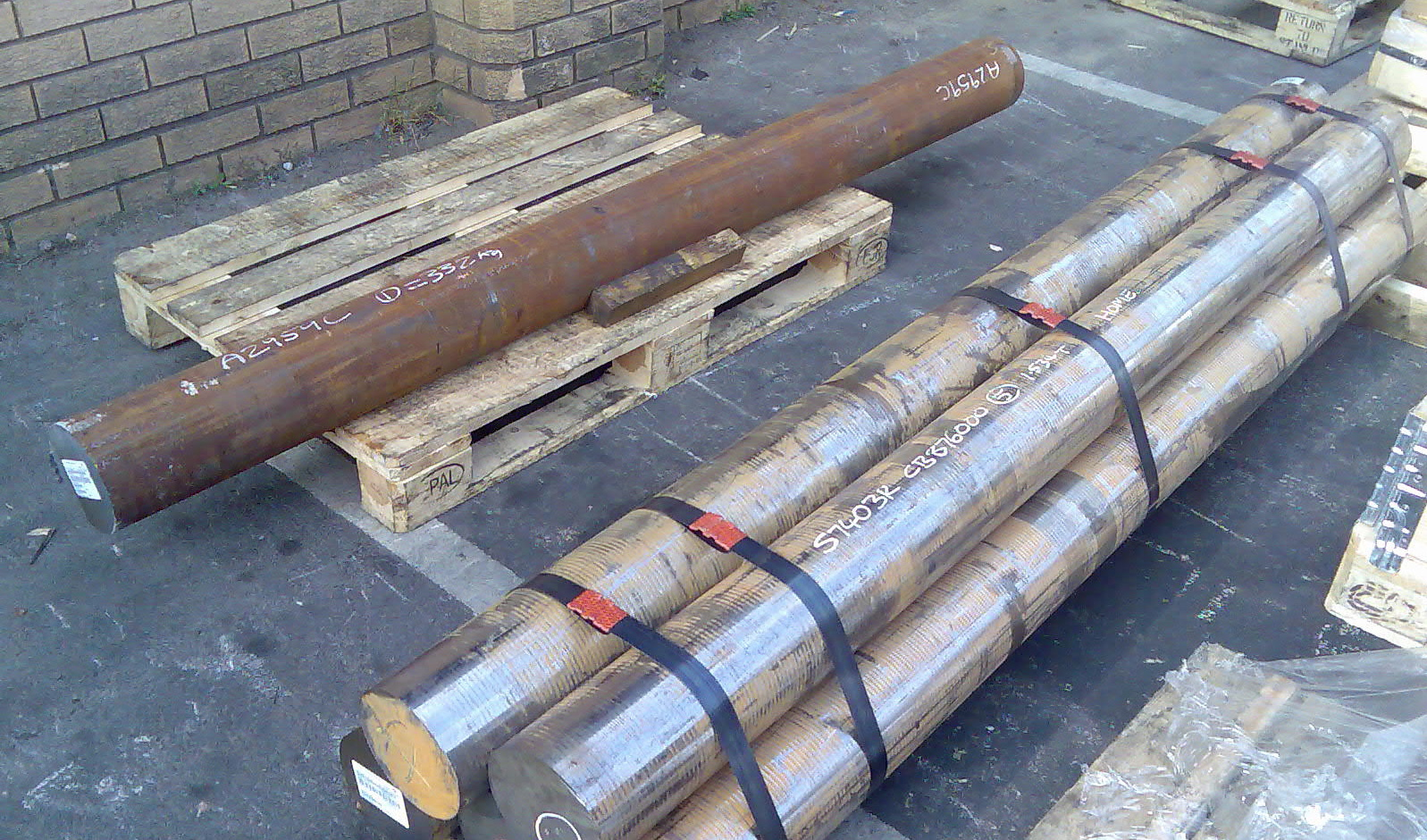
Bainite-rich steel shafts

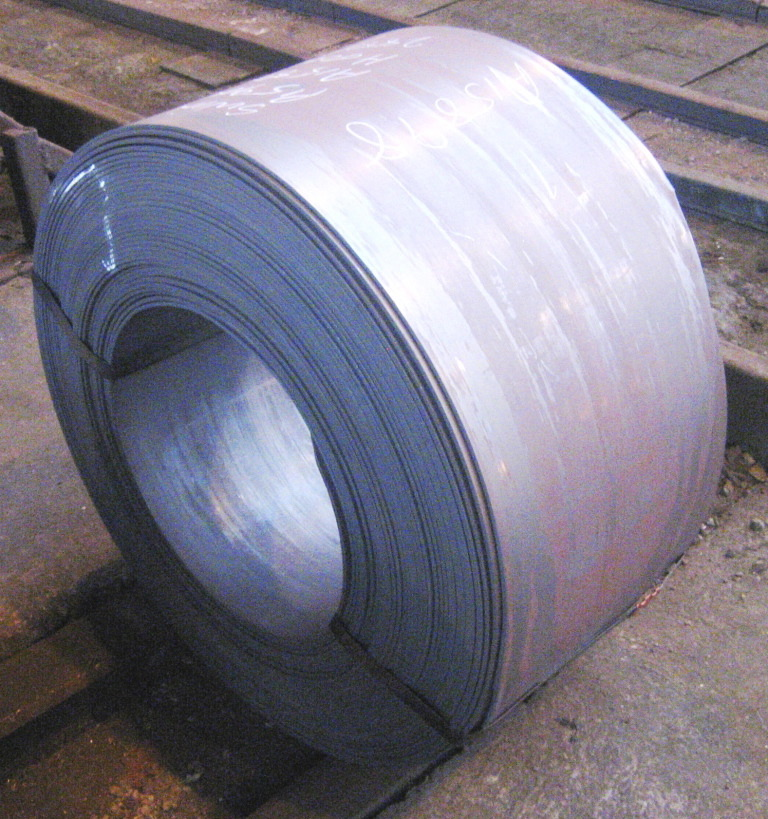
Bainite-rich steel roll

With increasing bainite content in steel, the hardness, yield and tensile strength remain almost constant for bainite content up to 50%, and then increase by ca. 30%. Hence meter-size shafts and plates of high-bainite steels have been commercially mass-produced by Rolls-Royce Holdings and Tata Steel.

In the railway industry, bainite steel is commonly alloyed with vanadium to produce rails of very high strength, with good wear and rolling contact fatigue resistance. Bainite rails fabricated by Corus were installed in the Channel Tunnel in 2006, and after 3 years showed no evidence of the cracks found in standard rails of the same age.
