= Pearlite =

Lamellar structure of ferrite and cementite

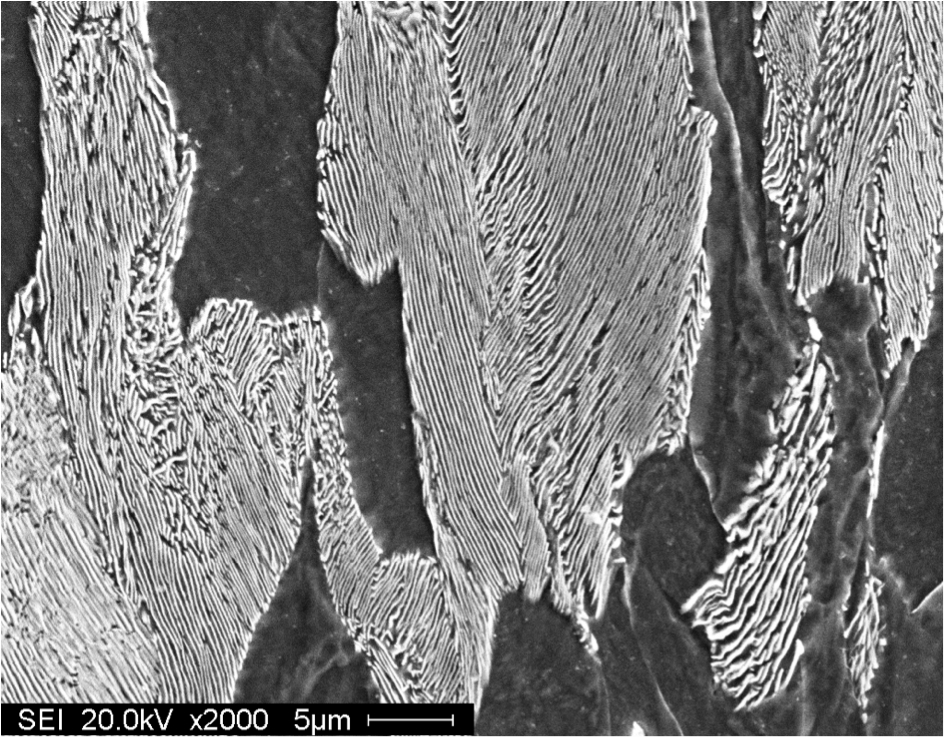
SEM micrograph of etched pearlite, 2000X.

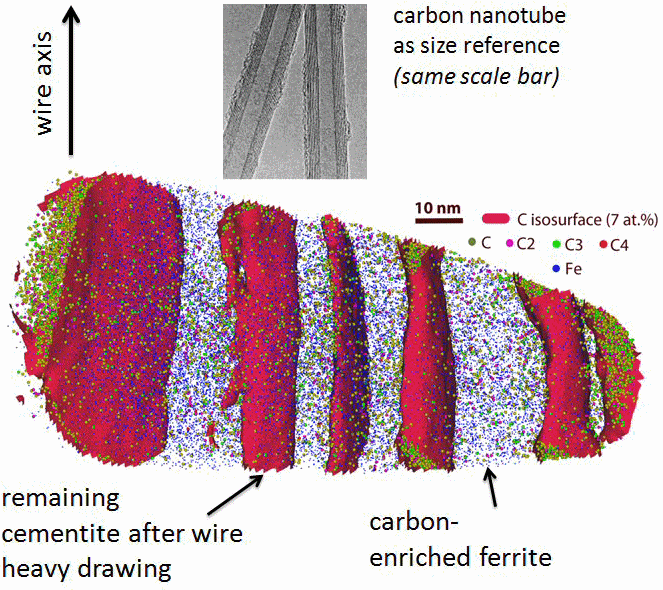
Atom probe tomography of pearlite. The red dots indicate the positions of carbon atoms. Iron atoms are not shown. The nanotube is shown for size reference.

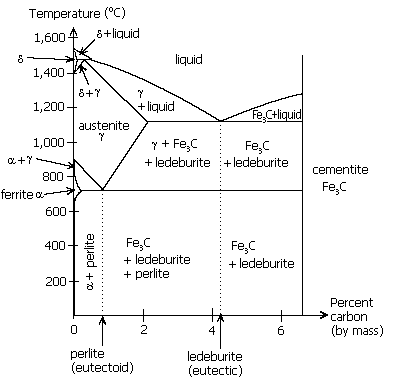
Pearlite occurs at the eutectoid of the iron-carbon phase diagram (near the lower left).

Pearlite is a two-phased, lamellar (or layered) structure composed of alternating layers of ferrite (87.5% by mass) and cementite (12.5% by mass) that occurs in some steels and cast irons. This description of alternating layers is not strictly correct, each pearlite colony consists of a bicrystal of interpenetrating layers. A good analogy is a cabbage in a bucket of water, where all the leaves (cementite) are connected, but so is the water (ferrite). It is in two-dimensional sections that the appearance is of alternating layers. During slow cooling of an iron-carbon alloy, pearlite forms by a eutectoid reaction as austenite cools below 727 °C (1,341 °F) (the eutectoid temperature). Pearlite is a microstructure occurring in the vast majority of structural steels.

== Composition ==
The eutectoid composition of austenite in Fe-C is 0.76wt% carbon; steel with less carbon content (hypoeutectoid steel) will contain a corresponding proportion of carbon-depleted proeutectoid-ferrite that grows prior to the pearlite transformation of the residual austenite. Likewise, steels with higher carbon content (hypereutectoid steels) will form cementite before reaching the eutectoid point. The proportion of ferrite and cementite forming above the eutectoid point can be calculated from the iron/iron—carbide equilibrium phase diagram using the lever rule.

Steels with pearlitic (eutectoid composition) or near-pearlitic microstructure (near-eutectoid composition) can be drawn into thin wires. Such wires, often bundled into ropes, are commercially used as piano wires, ropes for suspension bridges, and as steel cord for tire reinforcement. High degrees of wire drawing (logarithmic strain above 3) lead to pearlitic wires with yield strengths of several gigapascals. It makes pearlite one of the strongest structural bulk materials on earth. Some hypereutectoid pearlitic steel wires, when cold wire drawn to true (logarithmic) strains above 5, can even show a maximal tensile strength above 6 GPa (870 ksi). Although pearlite is used in many engineering applications, the origin of its extreme strength is not well understood. It has been recently shown that cold wire drawing not only strengthens pearlite by refining the lamellae structure, but also simultaneously causes partial chemical decomposition of cementite, associated with an increased carbon content of the ferrite phase, deformation induced lattice defects in ferrite lamellae, and even a structural transition from crystalline to amorphous cementite. The deformation-induced decomposition and microstructural change of cementite is closely related to several other phenomena such as a strong redistribution of carbon and other alloy elements like silicon and manganese in both the cementite and the ferrite phase; a variation of the deformation accommodation at the phase interfaces due to a change in the carbon concentration gradient at the interfaces; and mechanical alloying.

Pearlite was first identified by Henry Clifton Sorby and initially named sorbite, however the similarity of microstructure to nacre and especially the optical effect caused by the scale of the structure made the alternative name more popular.

Pearlite forms as a result of the cooperative growth of ferrite and cementite during the decomposition of austenite. The morphology of pearlite is significantly affected by the cooling rate and coiling temperature. At lower coiling temperatures, pearlite forms with finer lamellar spacing, resulting in enhanced mechanical properties due to the finer distribution of ferrite and cementite layers. Conversely, at higher coiling temperatures, pearlite forms with coarser lamellae, and a smaller amount of pearlite is observed as coarse cementite particles tend to dominate the structure. The carbon diffusion during the formation of pearlite, just ahead of the growth front, is critical in determining the thickness of the lamellae and, consequently, the strength of the steel.

Bainite is a similar structure with lamellae much smaller than the wavelength of visible light and thus lacks this pearlescent appearance. It is prepared by more rapid cooling. Unlike pearlite, whose formation involves the diffusion of all atoms, bainite grows by a displacive transformation mechanism.

The transformation of pearlite to austenite takes place at lower critical temperature of 723 °C (1,333 °F). At this temperature pearlite changes to austenite because of nucleation process.

== Eutectoid steel ==
Eutectoid steel can in principle be transformed completely into pearlite; hypoeutectoid steels can also be completely pearlitic if transformed at a temperature below the normal eutectoid. Pearlite can be hard and strong but is not particularly tough. It can be wear-resistant because of a strong lamellar network of ferrite and cementite. Examples of applications include cutting tools, high strength wires, knives, chisels, and nails.
