= TRIP steel =

Class of high-strength steel alloys

The two options for a FCC alloy to absorb energy from stress loading: TWIP and TRIP.

TRIP steel are a class of high-strength steel alloys typically used in naval and marine applications and in the automotive industry. TRIP stands for "Transformation induced plasticity," which implies a phase transformation in the material, typically when a stress is applied. These alloys are known to possess an outstanding combination of strength and ductility.

== Microstructure ==
TRIP steels possess a microstructure consisting of austenite with sufficient thermodynamic instability such that transformation to martensite is achieved during loading or deformation. Many automotive TRIP steels possess retained austenite within a ferrite matrix, which may also contain hard phases like bainite and martensite. In the case of these alloys, the high silicon and carbon content of TRIP steels results in significant volume fractions of retained austenite in the final microstructure.

TRIP steels use higher quantities of carbon than dual-phase steels to obtain sufficient carbon content for stabilizing the retained austenite phase to below ambient temperature. Higher contents of silicon and/or aluminium accelerate the ferrite/bainite formation. They are also added to avoid formation of carbide in the bainite region.

For use in naval and marine applications, both martensitic/austenitic and fully austenitic steels have been of interest due to their exhibited large uniform elongation, high strength, and high fracture toughness. These properties are exhibited because of a deformation-induced martensitic transformation from parent phase (FCC γ austenite) to the product phase (BCC α' martensite). This transformation is dependent on temperature, applied stress, composition, strain rate, and deformation history, among others.

== Metallurgical properties ==
During plastic deformation and straining, the retained austenite phase is transformed into martensite. Thus increasing the strength by the phenomenon of strain hardening. This transformation allows for enhanced strength and ductility. High strain hardening capacity and high mechanical strength lend these steels excellent energy absorption capacity. TRIP steels also exhibit a strong bake hardening effect. Bake hardening is an increase in strength observed when work hardening during part formation is followed by a thermal cycle such as paint-baking. Research to date has not shown much experimental evidence of the TRIP-effect enhancing ductility, since most of the austenite disappears in the first 5% of plastic strain, a regime where the steel has adequate ductility already. Many experiments show that TRIP steels are in fact simply a more complex dual-phase steel.

== Effect of alloying elements ==
The amount of carbon determines the strain level at which the retained austenite begins to transform to martensite. At lower carbon levels, the retained austenite begins to transform almost immediately upon deformation, increasing the work hardening rate and formability during the stamping process. At higher carbon contents, the retained austenite is more stable and begins to transform only at strain levels beyond those produced during forming.

== Effect of temperature ==
The temperature at which a TRIP steel is stressed or deformed can be related to the martensitic start temperature (Ms). Applied stresses can assist in the transformation process by effectively adding an increased energy for transformation that allows for the martensitic transformation to occur above the Ms temperature. Above the Ms temperature, transformation behavior is temperature dependent and shifts from stress-induced to strain-induced at a temperature known as the Msσ temperature. The Msσ temperature is defined as the maximum temperature at which an elastic stress causes a martensitic transformation, initially defined by Richman and Bolling. Below Msσ, martensitic transformation is classified as stress assisted because transformation nucleates on pre-existing sites (e.g., dislocations, grain boundaries, phase boundaries, etc.), and the applied stress thermodynamically assists the transformation. At temperatures above Msσ, yielding and plastic deformation occur before transformation, and nucleation of martensite occurs at the intersection of shear bands created from the strain of the plastic deformation.

== Effect on mechanical properties ==
The TRIP effect can be exploited to extend the uniform plastic ductility by delaying the onset of necking, thereby delaying the flow localization instability that follows the formation of a stable neck. The formation of a stable neck can be defined as when the fractional increase in true stress is equal to the fractional decrease in load-bearing area of a sample. This can also be described as the point at which the strain hardening rate in an engineering stress-strain curve becomes negative. This can be explained by a power law equation for stress-strain behavior for plastic flow:

σ_{T}=K(ε_{T})^{n}

Where n is the strain hardening coefficient, σ_{T} is the stress, ε_{T} is the strain, and K is the strength coefficient. By this equation, stable plastic flow is maintained by maintaining a minimum strain hardening coefficient, which can be expressed by:

n=σ_{0}exp(ε)

This exponential strain hardening behavior represents the optimal curvature of the stress-strain curve while maintaining a minimum n for stable nonlocal plastic flow. It has been observed that TRIP steels exhibit this exponential strain hardening behavior when deformed at a temperature near to and above M_{sσ}, thereby displaying an optimum in uniform plastic ductility. By this observation, the TRIP effect can reverse the curvature of stress-strain behavior, and this reversal drives significant improvement in uniform ductility.

== Applications ==
As a result of their high energy absorption capacity and fatigue strength, TRIP steels are particularly well suited for automotive structural and safety parts such as cross members, longitudinal beams, B-pillar reinforcements, sills and bumper reinforcements. The TRIP effect can also be utilized in forming operations, where improvements to ductility enable greater bend angles and more aggressive forming operations without cracking.

The most common TRIP range of steels comprises 2 cold rolled grades in both uncoated and coated formats (TRIP 690 and TRIP 780) and one hot rolled grade (TRIP 780), identified by their minimum ultimate tensile strength expressed in MPa.

TRIP steels are well suited to armor applications, where increases in uniform ductility (and therefore ballistic energy absorption) can improve protection against projectiles and ballistic threats while maintaining or reducing plate thicknesses.
