= Alloy steel =

Steel alloyed with a variety of elements

Alloy steel is steel that is alloyed with a variety of elements in amounts between 1.0% and 50% by weight, typically to improve its mechanical properties.

== Types ==
Alloy steels divide into two groups: low and high alloy. The boundary between the two is disputed. William Smith and Javad Hashemi define the difference at 4.0%, while Paul Degarmo, et al., define it at 8.0%. Most alloy steels are low-alloy.

The simplest steels are iron (Fe) alloyed with (0.1% to 1%) carbon (C) and nothing else (excepting slight impurities); these are called carbon steels. However, alloy steel encompasses steels with additional (metal) alloying elements. Common alloyants include manganese (Mn) (the most common), nickel (Ni), chromium (Cr), molybdenum (Mo), vanadium (V), silicon (Si), and boron (B). Less common alloyants include Aluminium (Al), cobalt (Co), copper (Cu), cerium (Ce), niobium (Nb), titanium (Ti), tungsten (W), tin (Sn), zinc (Zn), lead (Pb), and zirconium (Zr).

== Properties ==
Alloy steels variously improve strength, hardness, toughness, wear resistance, corrosion resistance, hardenability, and hot hardness. To achieve these improved properties the metal may require specific heat treating, combined with strict cooling protocols.

Although alloy steels have been made for centuries, their metallurgy was not well understood until the advancing chemical science of the nineteenth century revealed their compositions. Alloy steels from earlier times were expensive luxuries made on the model of "secret recipes" and forged into tools such as knives and swords. Machine age alloy steels were tool steels and stainless steels.

Because of iron's ferromagnetic properties, some alloys find important applications where their responses to magnetism are valued, including in electric motors and in transformers.

== Low-alloy steels ==
Principal low-alloy steels
SAE designation	Composition
13xx	Mn 1.75%
40xx	Mo 0.20% or 0.25% or 0.25% Mo & 0.042% S
41xx	Cr 0.50% or 0.80% or 0.95%, Mo 0.12% or 0.20% or 0.25% or 0.30%
43xx	Ni 1.82%, Cr 0.50% to 0.80%, Mo 0.25%
44xx	Mo 0.40% or 0.52%
46xx	Ni 0.85% or 1.82%, Mo 0.20% or 0.25%
47xx	Ni 1.05%, Cr 0.45%, Mo 0.20% or 0.35%
48xx	Ni 3.50%, Mo 0.25%
50xx	Cr 0.27% or 0.40% or 0.50% or 0.65%
50xxx	Cr 0.50%, C 1.00% min
50Bxx	Cr 0.28% or 0.50%, and added boron
51xx	Cr 0.80% or 0.87% or 0.92% or 1.00% or 1.05%
51xxx	Cr 1.02%, C 1.00% min
51Bxx	Cr 0.80%, and added boron
52xxx	Cr 1.45%, C 1.00% min
61xx	Cr 0.60% or 0.80% or 0.95%, V 0.10% or 0.15% min
86xx	Ni 0.55%, Cr 0.50%, Mo 0.20%
87xx	Ni 0.55%, Cr 0.50%, Mo 0.25%
88xx	Ni 0.55%, Cr 0.50%, Mo 0.35%
92xx	Si 1.40% or 2.00%, Mn 0.65% or 0.82% or 0.85%, Cr 0.00% or 0.65%
94Bxx	Ni 0.45%, Cr 0.40%, Mo 0.12%, and added boron
ES-1	Ni 5%, Cr 2%, Si 1.25%, W 1%, Mn 0.85%, Mo 0.55%, Cu 0.5%, Cr 0.40%, C 0.2%, V 0.1%

== Material science ==
Alloying elements enable specific properties. As a guideline, alloying elements are added in lower percentages (less than 5%) to increase strength or hardenability, or in larger percentages (over 5%) to improve corrosion resistance or temperature stability.

Properties
Property	Elements	Mechanism
Steelmaking	Manganese, silicon, or aluminum	remove dissolved oxygen, sulfur and phosphorus
Strength	Manganese, silicon, nickel, and copper	form solid solutions in ferrite
Strength	Chromium, vanadium, molybdenum, and tungsten	form second-phase carbides
Corrosion resistance	Nickel and copper	
Embrittlement resistance	Molybdenum	
Control inclusion shape	Zirconium, cerium, and calcium	
Machinability	Sulfur (manganese sulfide), lead, bismuth, selenium, and tellurium	

The alloying elements tend to form either solid solutions, compounds or carbides.

- Nickel is soluble in ferrite; therefore, it usually forms Ni_{3}Al.
- Aluminum dissolves in ferrite and forms Al_{2}O_{3} and AlN. Silicon is also soluble and usually forms SiO_{2}•M_{x}O_{y}.
- Manganese mostly dissolves in ferrite forming MnS, MnO•SiO_{2}, but also carbides: (Fe,Mn)_{3}C.
- Chromium forms partitions between the ferrite and carbide phases in steel, forming (Fe,Cr_{3})C, Cr_{7}C_{3}, and Cr_{23}C_{6}. The type of carbide that chromium forms depends on the amount of carbon and other alloying elements present.
- Tungsten and molybdenum form carbides given enough carbon and an absence of stronger carbide forming elements (i.e., titanium and niobium), they form the carbides W_{2}C and Mo_{2}C, respectively.
- Vanadium, titanium, and niobium are strong carbide-forming elements, forming vanadium carbide, titanium carbide, and niobium carbide, respectively.

=== Eutectoid temperature ===
Alloying elements can have an effect on the eutectoid temperature.

- Manganese and nickel lower the eutectoid temperature and are known as austenite stabilizing elements. With enough of these elements the austenitic structure may form at room temperature.
- Carbide-forming elements raise the eutectoid temperature and stabilize ferrites.

Principal effects of major alloying elements for steel
Element	Percentage	Primary function
Aluminum	0.95–1.30	Alloying element in nitriding steels
Bismuth	—	Improves machinability
Boron	0.001–0.003	(Boron steel) A powerful hardenability agent
Chromium	0.5–2	Increases hardenability
Chromium	4–18	(Stainless steel) Increases corrosion resistance
Copper	0.1–0.4	Corrosion resistance
Lead	—	Improved machinability
Manganese	0.25–0.40	Combines with sulfur and with phosphorus to reduce brittleness. Also helps to remove excess oxygen.
Manganese	>1	Increases hardenability by lowering transformation points and causing transformations to be sluggish
Molybdenum	0.2–5	Stable carbides; inhibits grain growth. Increases the toughness of steel, thus making molybdenum a very valuable alloy metal for making the cutting parts of machine tools and also the turbine blades of turbojet engines. Also used in rocket motors.
Nickel	2–5	Toughener
Nickel	12–20	Increases corrosion resistance
Niobium	—	Stabilizes microstructure
Silicon	0.2–0.7	Increases strength
Silicon	2.0	Spring steels
Silicon	Higher percentages	Improves magnetic properties
Sulfur	0.08–0.15	Free-machining properties
Titanium	—	Fixes carbon in inert particles; reduces martensitic hardness in chromium steels
Tungsten	—	Also increases the melting point.
Vanadium	0.15	Stable carbides; increases strength while retaining ductility; promotes fine grain structure. Increases the toughness at high temperatures

== Microstructure ==
The properties of steel depend on its microstructure: the arrangement of different phases, some harder, some with greater ductility. At the atomic level, the four phases of auto steel include martensite (the hardest yet most brittle), bainite (less hard), ferrite (more ductile), and austenite (the most ductile). The phases are arranged by steelmakers by manipulating intervals (sometimes by seconds only) and temperatures of the heating and cooling process.

== Transformation-induced plasticity ==
TRIP steels transform from relatively ductile to relatively hard under deformation such as in a car crash. Deformation transforms austenitic microstructure to martensitic microstructure. TRIP steels use relatively high carbon content to create the austenitic microstructure. Relatively high silicon/aluminum content suppresses carbide precipitation in the bainite region and helps accelerate ferrite/bainite formation. This helps retain carbon to support austenite at room temperature. A specific cooling process reduces the austenite/martensite transformation during forming. TRIP steels typically require an isothermal hold at an intermediate temperature during cooling, which produces some bainite. The additional silicon/carbon requires weld cycle modification, such as the use of pulsating welding or dilution welding.

In one approach steel is heated to a high temperature, cooled somewhat, held stable for an interval and then quenched. This produces islands of austenite surrounded by a matrix of softer ferrite, with regions of harder bainite and martensite. The resulting product can absorb energy without fracturing, making it useful for auto parts such as bumpers and pillars.

Three generations of advanced, high-strength steel are available. The first was created in the 1990s, increasing strength and ductility. A second generation used new alloys to further increase ductility, but were expensive and difficult to manufacture. The third generation is emerging. Refined heating and cooling patterns increase strength at some cost in ductility (vs 2nd generation). These steels are claimed to approach nearly ten times the strength of earlier steels; and are much cheaper to manufacture.

== Intermetallics ==
Researches created an alloy with the strength of steel and the lightness of titanium alloy. It combined iron, aluminum, carbon, manganese, and nickel. The other ingredient was uniformly distributed nanometer-sized B2 intermetallic (two metals with equal numbers of atoms) particles. The use of nickel avoided problems with earlier attempts to use B2, while increasing ductility.

== See also ==
- Dual-phase steel
- HSLA steel
- Microalloyed steel
- SAE steel grades
- Reynolds 531
