= Austempered Ductile Iron =

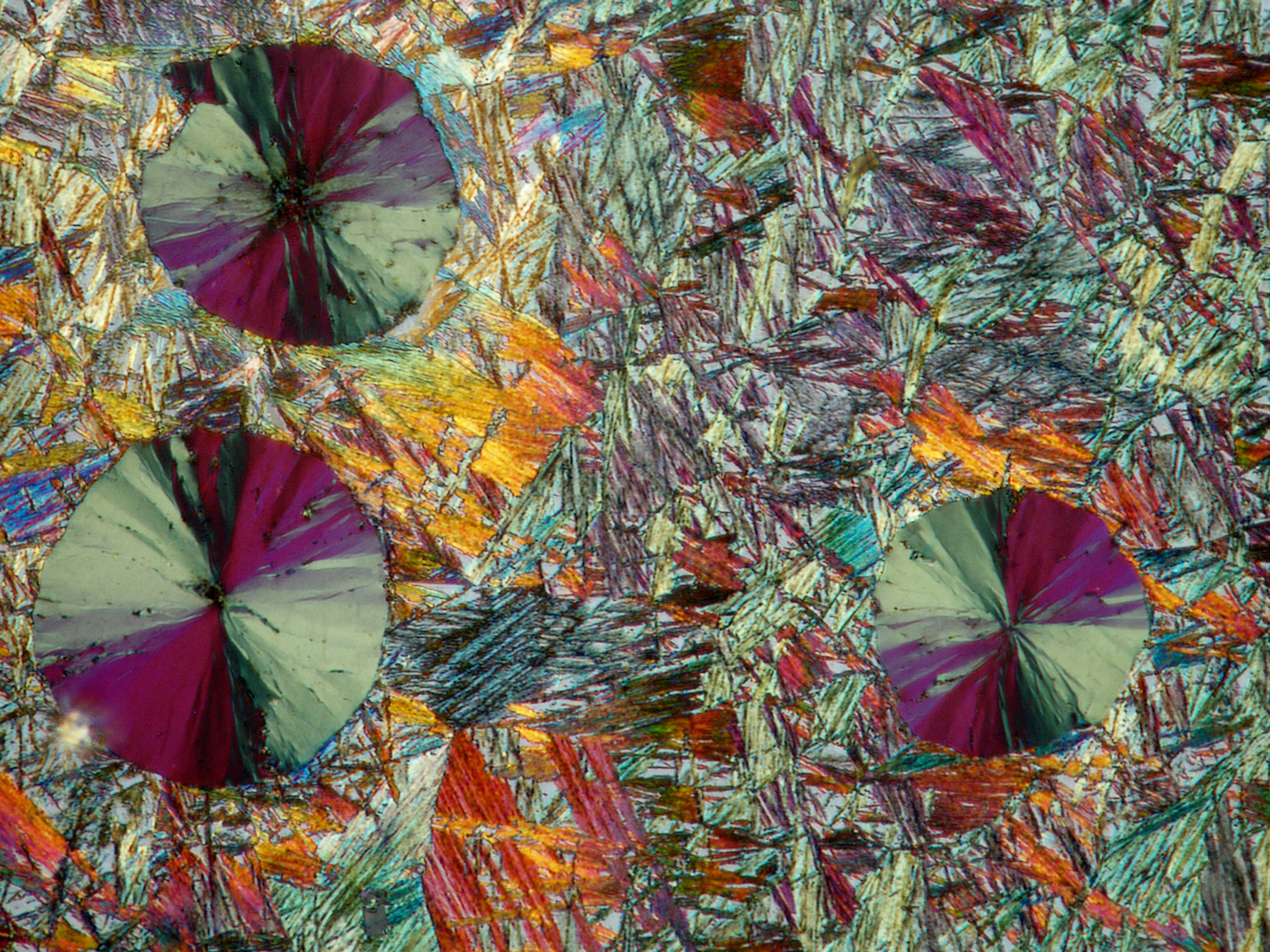
Microstructure of ADI

Austempered Ductile Iron (ADI) is a form of ductile iron that enjoys high strength and ductility as a result of its microstructure controlled through heat treatment. While conventional ductile iron was discovered in 1943 and the austempering process had been around since the 1930s, the combination of the two technologies was not commercialized until the 1970s.

== Microstructure ==
Like all ductile iron, ADI is characterized by its spheroidal graphite nodules spaced within the matrix. These nodules reduce microsegregation of solutes within the material. For ADI, the material has been austempered such that the matrix is transformed into ausferrite, or a mixture of acicular ferrite and austenite. The microstructure is used to classify ADI into grades, which depend on the heat treatment process and not the composition of the material.

== Mechanical properties ==
The high strength and ductility of ADI are a direct result of its microstructure. Specifically, the ductility of ductile irons is a result of the lack of bainite in the matrix. Rather, the austempering process forms acicular ferrite and austenite. The latter of these has a face-centered cubic (FCC) structure. The FCC has 12 slip systems that allow for dislocations motion, resulting in high ductility in the austenitic phase of ADI. This ductility also translates to relatively high toughness in ADI.

The increase in ductility that ADI exhibits over other form of cast iron also comes as a result of the spheroidal graphite. As compared to the flake-like graphite present in gray iron, for example, the spheroidal graphite nodes are relatively easy for dislocations to bypass, increasing the ductility of the material. These nodules also decrease the stress concentration compared to flakes, as stress at the tip of an inclusion is proportional to the radius of curvature. The large radius prevents the propagation of cracks in the material, further resulting in high ductility and good fatigue properties in the material.

Some of the austenite phase mentioned above is mechanically metastable and will form martensite when subjected to high stress. The combination of hard, wear-resistant martensite with ausferrite results in good wear properties, as the regions near a crack tip strengthen and prevent further propagation. This is not an example of work hardening, which multiplies dislocations that inhibit each other's growth and result in higher strength. Rather, a phase transformation is taking place as a result of applied stress.

The mechanical properties of ADI are extremely dependent on processing. Wide ranges in strength and ductility are possible. High temperature heat treatment (>400C) results in high ductility, good impact toughness, with a yield strength around 500 MPa. Lower temperatures (~260C) results in a higher yield strength of 1400 MPa and high hardness but much lower ductility.
