= TWIP steel =

Type of steel

The two options for a FCC alloy to absorb energy from stress loading: TWIP and TRIP.

Twinning-Induced Plasticity steel which is also known as TWIP steel is a class of austenitic steels which can deform by both glide of individual dislocations and mechanical twinning on the ${111}_\gamma \; \langle11\bar{2}\rangle_\gamma$ system. They have outstanding mechanical properties at room temperature combining high strength (ultimate tensile strength of up to 800 MPa) and ductility (elongation to failure up to 100%) based on a high work-hardening capacity. TWIP steels have mostly high content in Mn (above 20% in weight %) and small additions of elements such C (<1 wt.%), Si (<3 wt.%), or Al (<3 wt.%). The steels have low stacking fault energy (between 20 and 40 mJ/m^{2}) at room temperature. Although the details of the mechanisms controlling strain-hardening in TWIP steels are still unclear, the high strain-hardening is commonly attributed to the reduction of the dislocation mean free path with the increasing fraction of deformation twins as these are considered to be strong obstacles to dislocation glide. Therefore, a quantitative study of deformation twinning in TWIP steels is critical to understand their strain-hardening mechanisms and mechanical properties. Deformation twinning can be considered as a nucleation and growth process. Twin growth is assumed to proceed by co-operative movement of Shockley partials on subsequent ${111}$ planes.

== History ==
First steel based on plasticity induced by mechanical twinning was found in 1998 which had strength of 800 MPa with a total elongation of above 85%. These values vary with deformation temperature, strain rate and chemical composition.

Researchers have shown that increased work hardening attributed to the partitioning of the austenite grains is the main contributing factor to the overall elongation of TWIP steels in which the mechanical strain of twinning have a rather small contribution.

== Hardening mechanisms ==
The work-hardening behaviour of TWIP steels is governed by a dynamic Hall–Petch effect, in which the effective microstructural barrier spacing decreases continuously during plastic deformation. Grain boundaries and deformation twins both act as obstacles to dislocation glide, so the characteristic obstacle spacing L is determined by the combined contributions of the grain size d and the deformation-twin spacing t:

$\frac{1}{L} = \frac{1}{d} + \frac{1}{t}$

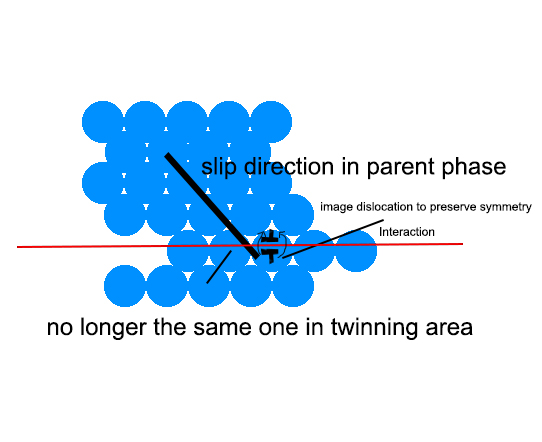
Schematic diagram of twin as obstacle

During straining, deformation twins nucleate and thicken within the austenitic matrix. As the twin volume fraction increases, the average twin spacing t decreases. Because L depends on the reciprocal sum of d and t, the formation of new twin boundaries progressively refines the effective microstructural length scale, leading to increasing flow stress and the high work-hardening rates characteristic of TWIP steels.

Dislocations accumulate at grain and twin boundaries, forming pile-ups that generate a back-stress opposing further plastic flow. The back-stress contribution may be expressed as:

$$\sigma_b = M \mu b \frac{n}{L}$$

where M is the Taylor factor, μ the shear modulus, b the Burgers vector of dislocations, and n the number of dislocations stored at the barriers. In the geometrical pile-up model developed for TWIP steels, continued straining leads to progressive storage of dislocations at grain and twin boundaries, so that both the number of piled-up dislocations n and the effective obstacle density 1/L increase with strain. The simultaneous growth of n and reduction of L produces a strong dynamic Hall–Petch strengthening during deformation.

Overall, hardening in TWIP steels results from the continual generation of deformation twins, the associated decrease in obstacle spacing, and the development of back-stress from dislocation pile-ups at grain and twin boundaries. This evolving microstructure enables TWIP steels to maintain high strain-hardening rates over large strains.

== Influence of stacking-fault energy in steels ==
In austenitic Fe–Mn–C and Fe–Mn–(Al,Si) steels, the stacking-fault energy (SFE) controls the separation of Shockley partial dislocations and thereby determines whether deformation is governed by ε-martensite formation (TRIP), mechanical twinning (TWIP), or dislocation glide. Low SFE promotes the γ (fcc) → ε (hcp) martensitic pathway, whereas intermediate SFE favours the thickening of deformation twins. Increasing SFE further suppresses twinning and promotes dislocation glide as the dominant deformation mode.

=== Low SFE: TRIP-dominated regime ===
When the SFE is low, extended stacking faults are energetically favourable and local hcp sequences form readily, promoting γ→ε martensitic transformation. Deformation is therefore dominated by the TRIP effect.

=== Intermediate SFE: TWIP-dominated regime ===
At intermediate SFE, stacking faults remain stable but the nucleation barrier for ε-martensite increases. Shockley partial dislocations can successively nucleate on adjacent {111} planes, enabling the formation and thickening of deformation twins, which characterise the TWIP effect.

=== High SFE: dislocation-glide regime ===
When the SFE becomes sufficiently high, the separation of Shockley partials is reduced, cross-slip becomes easier, and deformation is governed predominantly by planar or wavy dislocation glide rather than twinning or ε-martensite formation. Experimental studies on fully austenitic Fe–Mn–Al–C steels with elevated SFE show delayed or suppressed twinning and the dominance of dislocation glide during tensile deformation.

=== SFE near the TRIP–TWIP boundary: coexistence conditions ===
When the SFE lies close to the γ→ε transformation threshold, TRIP and TWIP may coexist. Under such metastable conditions, both stacking-fault-assisted ε-martensite nucleation and deformation twinning are energetically competitive. Deformation twins may either act as nucleation sites for ε-martensite or hinder its growth, enabling sustained TWIP–TRIP synergy within the same grain.

Comparison of the stacking-fault energy gains under shear stress in TWIP and in TRIP.

Such coexistence typically requires:

- **SFE near the TRIP–TWIP boundary**, allowing similar driving forces for ε-martensite and deformation twinning.
- **Moderate austenite stability**, avoiding either premature full γ→ε transformation or complete suppression of ε-martensite.
- **Sufficient applied stress or strain rate** to activate both partial-dislocation glide and stacking-fault-mediated ε-martensite nucleation.
- **Twin–martensite interactions**, where twin boundaries can serve as barriers or nucleation sites for phase transformation.

== Compositions ==
TWIP steels usually contain large concentrations of Mn because it is crucial to preserve the austenitic structure based on the ternary system of Fe-Mn-Al and control Stacking Fault Energy (SFE) of the Iron-based alloys.

The addition of aluminium to Fe-high Mn TWIP steels is because it increases SFE significantly and therefore stabilizes the austenite against phase transformations which can occur in the Fe-Mn alloys during deformation. Furthermore, it strengthens the austenite by solid-solution hardening.

== Properties ==
Total and uniform elongation of the Fe–55Mn–3Al–3Si wt% TWIP steel as a function of test temperature; strain rate ε = 10^{−4} s^{−1}.

0.2% proof and ultimate tensile strength of the Fe–55Mn–3Al–3Si wt% TWIP steel as a function of the test temperature; ε = 10^{−4} s^{−1}.

High-manganese austenitic TWIP steels combine high strength with remarkable ductility, a result of their ability to sustain large amounts of uniform deformation through the continuous formation of deformation twins. This combination enables these steels to absorb significantly more mechanical energy than conventional high-strength steels, making TWIP steel promising for automotive safety components, cryogenic vessels, armour, and specialised structural applications.TWIP steels also maintain stable strain distribution and delay the onset of necking, contributing to reliable performance under dynamic loading.

=== Advantages ===
TWIP steels offer several beneficial mechanical characteristics:

- **High energy absorption capacity**, arising from sustained work-hardening during deformation.
- **Large uniform elongation** that allows structural components to deform without premature localization.
- **Good strength–ductility balance**, improving crashworthiness and enabling weight-reduction strategies.
- **Stable deformation behavior**, which contributes to reliable failure modes in engineering structures.

=== Challenges in alloy development ===
Although TWIP steels have attractive mechanical properties, several factors complicate the design and industrial development of new TWIP grades:

- **Precise control of stacking-fault energy (SFE)** is required to ensure stable twinning; small changes in Mn, Al or C content can shift the balance between TRIP, TWIP and dislocation glide mechanisms.
- **Temperature sensitivity**, since deformation twinning becomes suppressed at elevated temperatures, limiting the usable processing or service windows.
- **Alloying trade-offs**, where adjustments that tune SFE may negatively affect castability, weldability or cost considerations.
- **Processing challenges**, as controlling grain size and twin morphology at industrial scale is necessary to achieve consistent properties across large components.

These considerations guide current alloy-development strategies, which focus on balancing composition, SFE, manufacturability and performance to tailor TWIP steels for specific structural applications.

== See also ==
- TRIP steel
