= High-strength low-alloy steel =

Type of alloy steel

High-strength low-alloy steel (HSLA) is a type of alloy steel that provides better mechanical properties or greater resistance to corrosion than carbon steel. HSLA steels vary from other steels in that they are not made to meet a specific chemical composition but rather specific mechanical properties. They have a carbon content between 0.05 and 0.25% to retain formability and weldability. Other alloying elements include up to 2.0% manganese and small quantities of copper, nickel, niobium, nitrogen, vanadium, chromium, molybdenum, titanium, calcium, rare-earth elements, or zirconium. Copper, titanium, vanadium, and niobium are added for strengthening purposes. These elements are intended to alter the microstructure of carbon steels, which is usually a ferrite-pearlite aggregate, to produce a very fine dispersion of alloy carbides in an almost pure ferrite matrix. This eliminates the toughness-reducing effect of a pearlitic volume fraction yet maintains and increases the material's strength by refining the grain size, which in the case of ferrite increases yield strength by 50% for every halving of the mean grain diameter. Precipitation strengthening plays a minor role, too. Their yield strengths can be anywhere between 250 and 590 megapascals (36,000 and 86,000 psi). Because of their higher strength and toughness HSLA steels usually require 25 to 30% more power to form, as compared to carbon steels.

Copper, silicon, nickel, chromium, and phosphorus are added to increase corrosion resistance. Zirconium, calcium, and rare-earth elements are added for sulfide-inclusion shape control which increases formability. These are needed because most HSLA steels have directionally sensitive properties. Formability and impact strength can vary significantly when tested longitudinally and transversely to the grain. Bends that are parallel to the longitudinal grain are more likely to crack around the outer edge because it experiences tensile loads. This directional characteristic is substantially reduced in HSLA steels that have been treated for sulfide shape control.

They are used in cars, trucks, cranes, bridges, roller coasters and other structures that are designed to handle large amounts of stress or need a good strength-to-weight ratio. HSLA steel cross-sections and structures are usually 20 to 30% lighter than a carbon steel with the same strength.

HSLA steels are also more resistant to rust than most carbon steels because of their lack of pearlite – the fine layers of ferrite (almost pure iron) and cementite in pearlite. HSLA steels usually have densities of around 7800 kg/m^{3}.

Military armour plate is mostly made from alloy steels, although some civilian armour against small arms is now made from HSLA steels with extreme low temperature quenching.

== Classifications ==
- Weathering steels: Steels which have better corrosion resistance. A common example is COR-TEN.
- Control-rolled steels: Hot rolled steels which have a highly deformed austenite structure that will transform to a very fine equiaxed ferrite structure upon cooling.
- Pearlite-reduced steels: Low carbon content steels which lead to little or no pearlite, but rather a very fine grain ferrite matrix. It is strengthened by precipitation hardening.
- Acicular ferrite steels: These steels are characterized by a very fine high strength acicular ferrite structure, a very low carbon content, and good hardenability.
- Dual-phase steels: These steels have a ferrite microstructure that contain small, uniformly distributed sections of martensite. This microstructure gives the steels a low yield strength, high rate of work hardening, and good formability.
- Microalloyed steels: Steels which contain very small additions of niobium, vanadium, and/or titanium to obtain a refined grain size and/or precipitation hardening.

A common type of micro-alloyed steel is improved-formability HSLA. It has a yield strength up to 80,000 psi (550 MPa) but costs only 24% more than A36 steel (36,000 psi (250 MPa)). One of the disadvantages of this steel is that it is 30 to 40% less ductile. In the U.S., these steels are dictated by the ASTM standards A1008/A1008M and A1011/A1011M for sheet metal and A656/A656M for plates. These steels were developed for the automotive industry to reduce weight without losing strength. Examples of uses include door-intrusion beams, chassis members, reinforcing and mounting brackets, steering and suspension parts, bumpers, and wheels.

== SAE grades ==
The Society of Automotive Engineers (SAE) maintains standards for HSLA steel grades because they are often used in automotive applications.

SAE HSLA steel grade compositions
Grade	% Carbon (max)	% Manganese (max)	% Phosphorus (max)	% Sulfur (max)	% Silicon (max)	Notes
942X	0.21	1.35	0.04	0.05	0.90	Niobium or vanadium treated
945A	0.15	1.00	0.04	0.05	0.90	
945C	0.23	1.40	0.04	0.05	0.90	
945X	0.22	1.35	0.04	0.05	0.90	Niobium or vanadium treated
950A	0.15	1.30	0.04	0.05	0.90	
950B	0.22	1.30	0.04	0.05	0.90	
950C	0.25	1.60	0.04	0.05	0.90	
950D	0.15	1.00	0.15	0.05	0.90	
950X	0.23	1.35	0.04	0.05	0.90	Niobium or vanadium treated
955X	0.25	1.35	0.04	0.05	0.90	Niobium, vanadium, or nitrogen treated
960X	0.26	1.45	0.04	0.05	0.90	Niobium, vanadium, or nitrogen treated
965X	0.26	1.45	0.04	0.05	0.90	Niobium, vanadium, or nitrogen treated
970X	0.26	1.65	0.04	0.05	0.90	Niobium, vanadium, or nitrogen treated
980X	0.26	1.65	0.04	0.05	0.90	Niobium, vanadium, or nitrogen treated

SAE HSLA steel grade mechanical properties
Grade	Form	Yield strength (min) [psi (MPa)]	Ultimate tensile strength (min) [psi (MPa)]
942X	Plates, shapes & bars up to 4 in.	42,000 (290)	60,000 (414)
945A, C	Sheet & strip	45,000 (310)	60,000 (414)
945A, C	Plates, shapes & bars:		
945A, C	0–0.5 in.	45,000 (310)	65,000 (448)
945A, C	0.5–1.5 in.	42,000 (290)	62,000 (427)
945A, C	1.5–3 in.	40,000 (276)	62,000 (427)
945X	Sheet, strip, plates, shapes & bars up to 1.5 in.	45,000 (310)	60,000 (414)
950A, B, C, D	Sheet & strip	50,000 (345)	70,000 (483)
950A, B, C, D	Plates, shapes & bars:		
950A, B, C, D	0–0.5 in.	50,000 (345)	70,000 (483)
950A, B, C, D	0.5–1.5 in.	45,000 (310)	67,000 (462)
950A, B, C, D	1.5–3 in.	42,000 (290)	63,000 (434)
950X	Sheet, strip, plates, shapes & bars up to 1.5 in.	50,000 (345)	65,000 (448)
955X	Sheet, strip, plates, shapes & bars up to 1.5 in.	55,000 (379)	70,000 (483)
960X	Sheet, strip, plates, shapes & bars up to 1.5 in.	60,000 (414)	75,000 (517)
965X	Sheet, strip, plates, shapes & bars up to 0.75 in.	65,000 (448)	80,000 (552)
970X	Sheet, strip, plates, shapes & bars up to 0.75 in.	70,000 (483)	85,000 (586)
980X	Sheet, strip & plates up to 0.375 in.	80,000 (552)	95,000 (655)

Ranking of various properties for SAE HSLA steel grades
Rank	Weldability	Formability	Toughness
Worst	980X	980X	980X
	970X	970X	970X
	965X	965X	965X
	960X	960X	960X
	955X, 950C, 942X	955X	955X
	945C	950C	945C, 950C, 942X
	950B, 950X	950D	945X, 950X
	945X	950B, 950X, 942X	950D
	950D	945C, 945X	950B
	950A	950A	950A
Best	945A	945A	945A

== Controlled rolling of HSLA steels ==
=== Mechanism ===
Controlled rolling

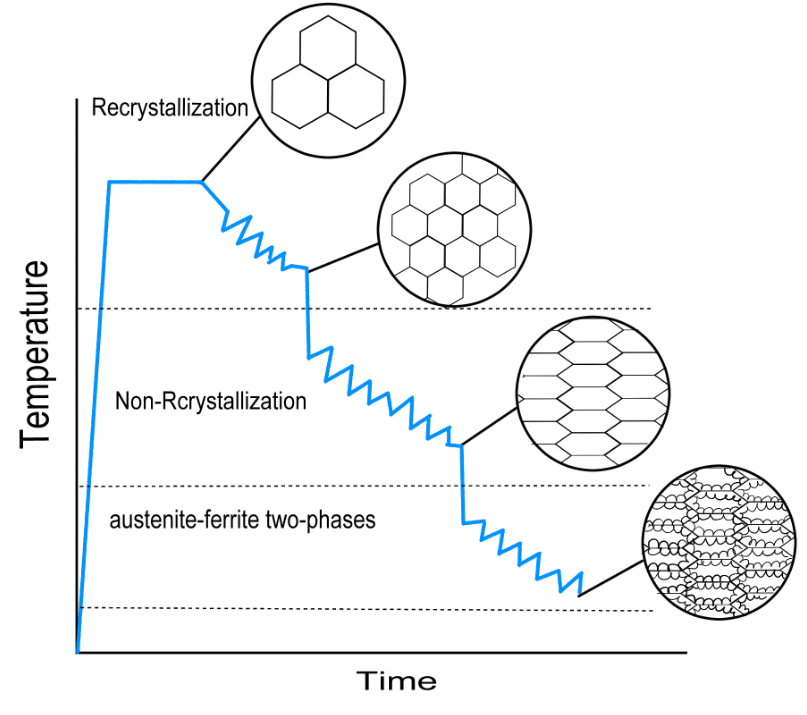
Change in microstructure at different controlled-rolling stages.

Controlled rolling is a method of refining the grain of steel by introducing a large amount of nucleation sites for ferrite in the austenite matrix by rolling it at precisely controlled temperature, thereby increasing the strength of the steel. There are three main stages in controlled rolling:

1) Deformation in recrystallization regions. In this stage, austenite is being recrystallized and refined, enabling refinement of ferrite grains in a later stage.

2) Deformation in non-recrystallization regions. Austenite grains are elongated by rolling. Deformation bands might present within the band as well. Elongated grain boundaries and deformation bands are all nucleation sites for ferrite.

3) Deformation in austenite-ferrite two phase region. Ferrite nucleates and austenite are further work-hardened.

Strengthening Mechanism

Control-rolled HSLA steels contain a combination of different strengthening mechanisms. The main strengthening effect comes from grain refinement (Grain boundary strengthening), in which strength increases as the grain size decreases. The other mechanisms include solid solution strengthening and precipitate hardening from micro-alloyed elements. After the steel passes the temperature of austenite-ferrite region, it is then further strengthened by work hardening.

=== Mechanical properties ===
Control-rolled HSLA steels usually have higher strength and toughness, as well as lower ductile-brittle transition temperature and ductile fracture properties. Below are some common micro-alloyed elements used to improve the mechanical properties.

Effect of micro-alloyed elements

Niobium: Nb can increase the recrystallization temperature by around 100 °C, thereby extending the non-recrystallization region and slowing down the grain growth. Nb can increase both the strength and toughness by precipitate strengthening and grain refinement. Moreover, Nb is a strong carbide/nitride former, the Nb(C, N) formed can hinder grain growth during austenite-to-ferrite transition.

Vanadium: V can significantly increase the strength and transition temperature by precipitate strengthening.

Titanium: Ti produces a slight increase in strengthen via both grain refinement and precipitate strengthening.

Nb, V, and Ti are three common alloying elements in HSLA steels. They are all good carbide and nitride formers, where the precipitates formed can prevent grain growth by pinning grain boundaries. They are also all ferrite formers, which increase the transition temperature of austenite-ferrite two phase region and reduce the non-recrystallization region. The reduction in the non-recrystallization region induces the formation of deformation bands and activated grain boundaries, which are alternative ferrite nucleation sites other than grain boundaries.

Other alloying elements are mainly for solid solution strengthening including silicon, manganese, chromium, copper, and nickel.

== Sources ==
- Degarmo, E. Paul; Black, J T.; Kohser, Ronald A. (2003), Materials and Processes in Manufacturing (9th ed.), Wiley, ISBN 0-471-65653-4.
- Oberg, E.; et al. (1996), Machinery's Handbook (25th ed.), Industrial Press Inc
