= Acicular =

Acicular may refer to

- In botany: a slender leaf shape
- In mineralogy: Acicular (crystal habit) refers to a needle-like crystal form
- Acicular ferrite, a microstructure of ferrite in steel
