= Steel =

Alloy of iron and carbon

Steel is an alloy of iron and carbon that demonstrates improved mechanical properties compared to the pure form of iron. Due to its high elastic modulus, yield strength, fracture strength and low raw material cost, steel is one of the most commonly manufactured materials in the world. Steel is used in structures (as concrete reinforcing rods or steel beams), in bridges, infrastructure, tools, ships, trains, cars, bicycles, machines, electrical appliances, furniture, and weapons.

Steel is defined as an alloy of iron and carbon and often other elements, with a carbon content up to 2.14%. Iron and carbon are always the main elements in steel, but other elements are used to produce various grades of steel, demonstrating altered material, mechanical, and microstructural properties. Stainless steels, for example, typically contain 18% chromium and exhibit improved corrosion and oxidation resistance versus their carbon steel counterpart. Galvanized steel is coated in a layer of zinc to achieve a similar effect. Under atmospheric pressures, steels generally take on two crystalline forms: body-centered cubic and face-centered cubic; however, depending on the thermal history and alloying, the microstructure may contain the distorted martensite phase or the carbon-rich cementite phase, which are tetragonal and orthorhombic, respectively. In the case of alloyed iron, the strengthening is primarily due to the introduction of carbon in the primarily-iron lattice, inhibiting deformation under mechanical stress. Alloying may also induce additional phases that affect the mechanical properties. In most cases, the engineered mechanical properties are at the expense of the ductility and elongation of the pure iron state, which decrease upon the addition of carbon.

Steel was produced in bloomery furnaces for thousands of years, but its large-scale, industrial use began only after more efficient production methods were devised in the 17th century, with the introduction of the blast furnace and production of crucible steel. This was followed by the Bessemer process in England in the mid-19th century, and then by the open-hearth furnace. With the invention of the Bessemer process, a new era of mass-produced steel began. Mild steel replaced wrought iron. The German states were the major steel producers in Europe in the 19th century. American steel production was centred in Pittsburgh, Bethlehem, Pennsylvania, and Cleveland, Ohio until the late 20th century. Currently, world steel production is centered in China, which produced 54% of the world's steel in 2023.

Further refinements in the process, such as basic oxygen steelmaking (BOS), largely replaced earlier methods by further lowering the cost of production and increasing the quality of the final product. Today, more than 1.6 billion tons of steel are produced annually. Modern steel is generally identified by various grades defined by assorted standards organizations. The modern steel industry is one of the largest manufacturing industries in the world, but also one of the most energy and greenhouse gas emission intense industries, contributing 8% of global emissions. However, steel is also very reusable: it is one of the world's most-recycled materials, with a recycling rate of over 60% globally.

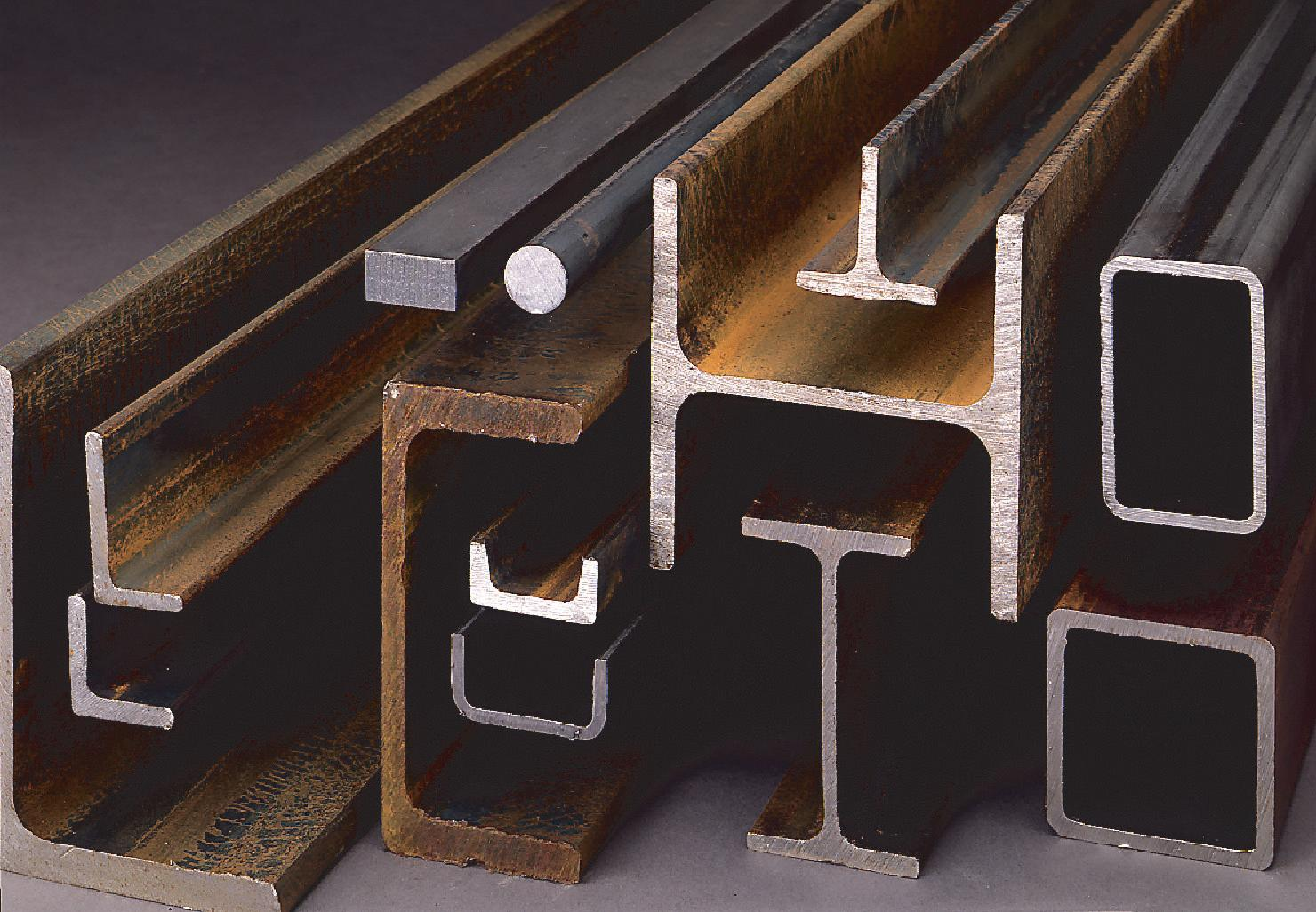
Structural steel bars of different shapes used in construction

== Definitions and related materials ==
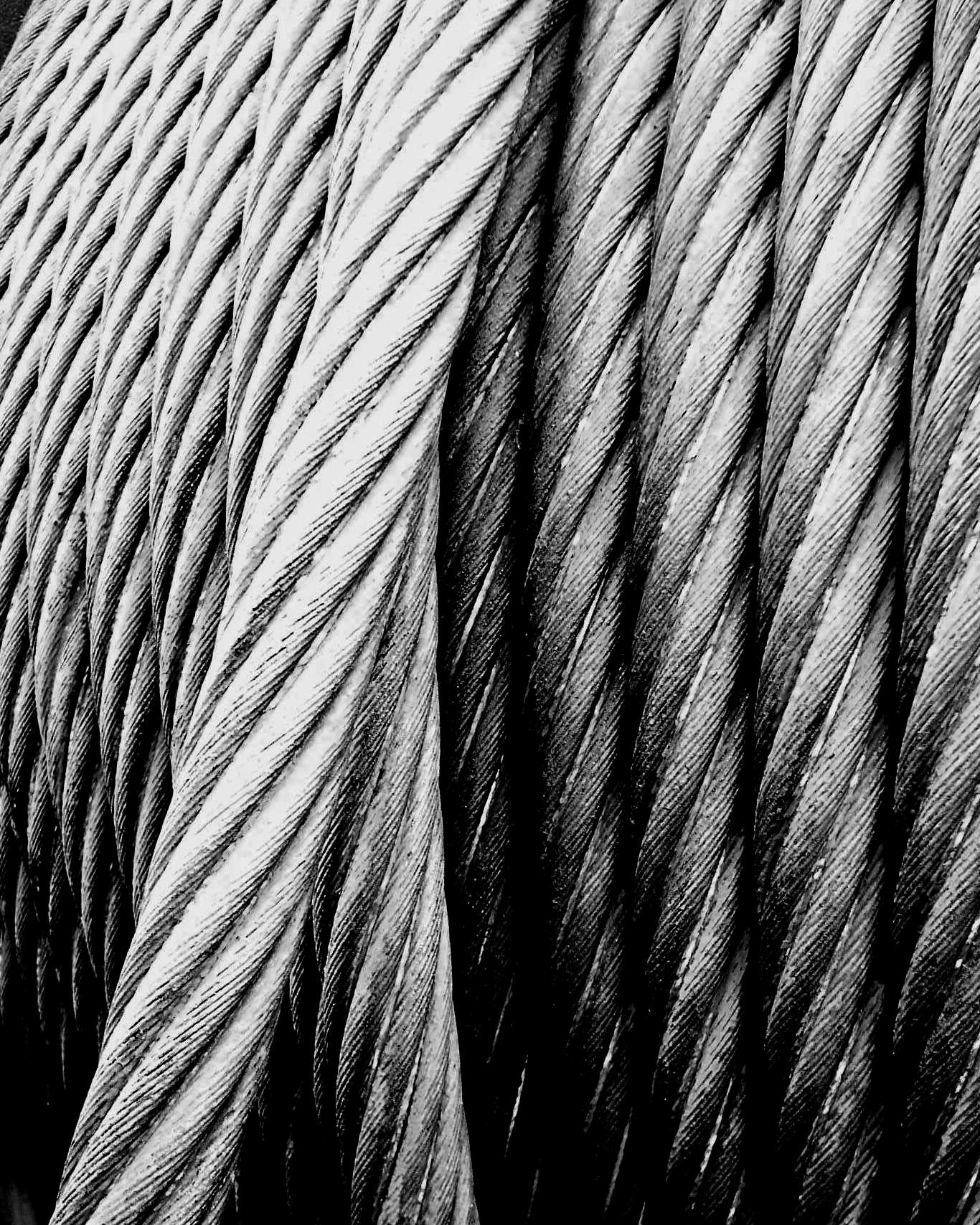
Steel cable of a colliery headframe

The noun steel originates from the Proto-Germanic adjective *stahliją or *stakhlijan 'made of steel', which is related to *stahlaz or *stahliją 'standing firm'.

The carbon content of steel is between 0.02% and 2.14% by weight for plain carbon steel (iron-carbon alloys). Alloy steel is steel to which other alloying elements have been intentionally added to modify the characteristics of steel. Common alloying elements include manganese, nickel, chromium, molybdenum, boron, titanium, vanadium, tungsten, cobalt, and niobium. Additional elements, most frequently considered undesirable, are also important in steel: phosphorus, sulphur, silicon, and traces of oxygen, nitrogen, and copper.

Plain iron–carbon alloys with a higher than 2.1% carbon content are known as cast iron. With modern steelmaking techniques such as powder metal forming, it is possible to make very high-carbon (and other alloy material) steels, but such are not common. Cast iron is not malleable even when hot, but it can be formed by casting as it has a lower melting point than steel and good castability properties. Certain compositions of cast iron, while retaining the economies of melting and casting, can be heat treated after casting to make malleable iron or ductile iron objects. Steel is distinguishable from wrought iron (now largely obsolete), which may contain a small amount of carbon A (<0.1 %) but large amounts of slag (around 1–2%).

== Production ==
Steel production

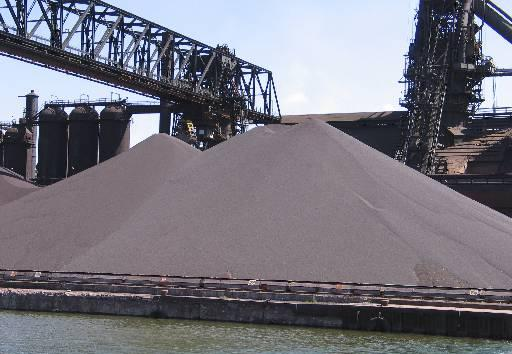
Iron ore pellets used in the production of steel

When iron is smelted from its ore with coke or charcoal, the result has a high amount of carbon and is known as pig iron. To become steel, it must be reprocessed to reduce the carbon to the correct amount, at which point other elements may be added. This process is called refinement, where oxygen is injected into the molten iron to remove excess carbon; oxygen reacts with the carbon to create carbon dioxide gas.

Historically this process would involve continuous trial and error testing of the cooled product to assess whether the correct amount of carbon was present for the material to possess the properties of steel. Today chemical analysis can be performed to determine the exact composition of the alloy, in addition to practical testing of the material's properties such as the Rockwell hardness test, Ultrasonic testing, the Charpy impact test, and the Three-point flexural test. In the past, steel facilities would cast the raw steel product into ingots which would be stored until use in further refinement processes that resulted in the finished product. In modern facilities, the initial product is close to the final composition and is continuously cast into long slabs, cut and shaped into bars and extrusions and heat treated to produce a final product. Today, approximately 96% of steel is continuously cast, while only 4% is produced as ingots. The ingots are then heated in a soaking pit and hot rolled into slabs, billets, or blooms. Slabs are hot or cold rolled into sheet metal or plates. Billets are hot or cold rolled into bars, rods, and wire. Blooms are hot or cold rolled into structural steel, such as I-beams and rails. In modern steel mills these processes often occur in one assembly line, with ore coming in and finished steel products coming out. Sometimes after a steel's final rolling, it is heat treated for strength; however, this is relatively rare.

== Material properties ==
=== Origins and production ===
An iron-carbon phase diagram showing the conditions necessary to form different phases

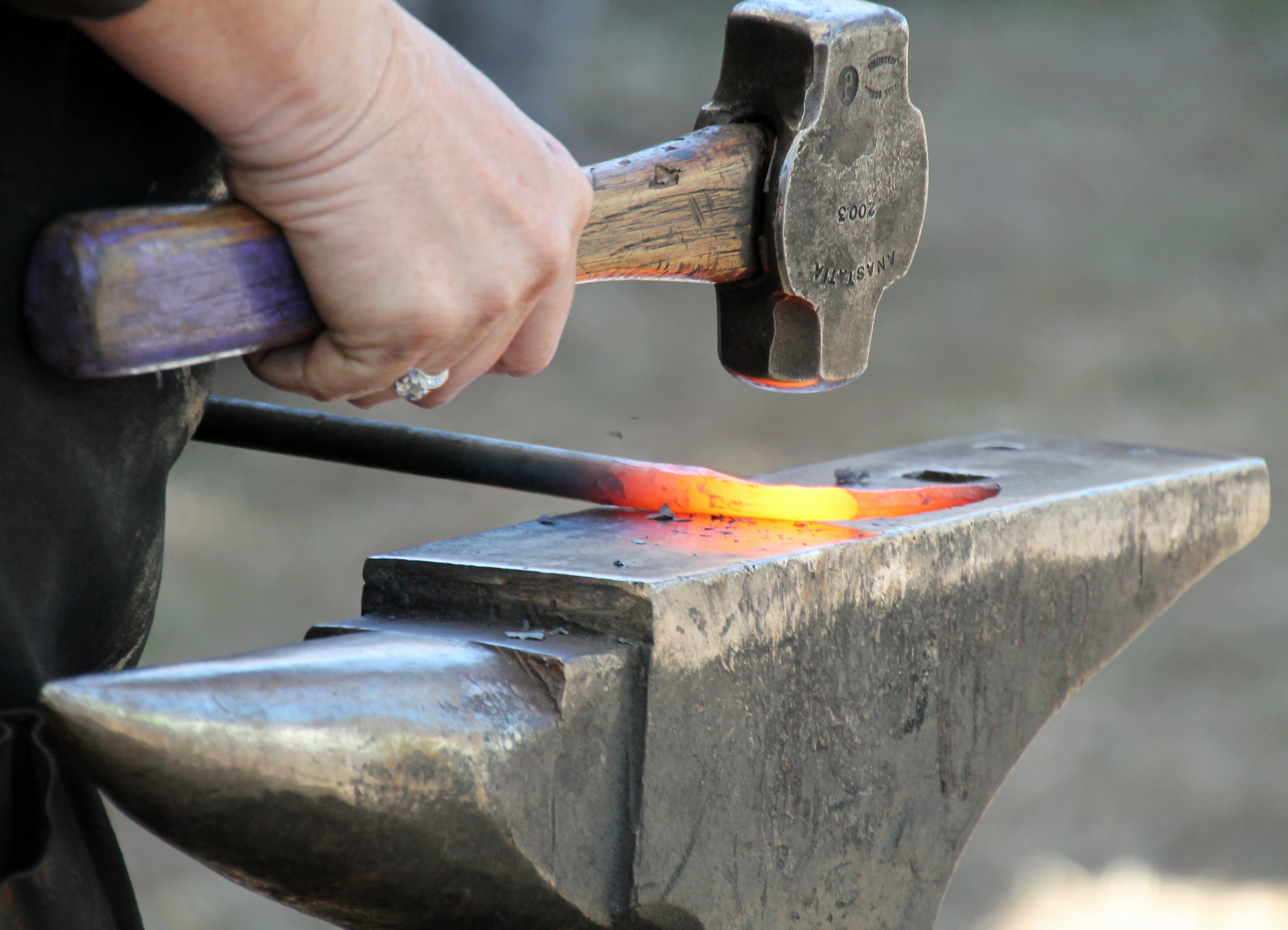
An incandescent steel workpiece in a blacksmith's art

Iron is commonly found in the Earth's crust in the form of an ore, usually an iron oxide, such as magnetite or hematite. Iron is extracted from iron ore under reductive conditions, where oxygen reacts with carbon in the fuel to produce carbon monoxide, which then reduces the iron oxide into metallic iron. This process, known as smelting, was first applied to metals with lower melting points, such as tin, which melts at about 250 °C (482 °F), and copper, which melts at about 1,100 °C (2,010 °F), and the combination, bronze, which has a melting point lower than 1,083 °C (1,981 °F). In comparison, iron melts at about 1,540 °C (2,800 °F), a temperature not attainable at the start of the Iron Age. Small quantities of iron were smelted in ancient times in a semi-liquid state by repeatedly heating the ore in a charcoal fire and then welding the resulting clumps together with a hammer. The process eliminated much of the impurities, resulting in the production of wrought iron. As furnaces reached higher temperatures due to bellows improvements leading to increased airflow, iron with higher carbon contents were able to be produced. Unlike copper and tin, liquid or solid iron dissolves carbon quite readily.

All of these temperatures could be reached with ancient methods used since the Bronze Age. Since the oxidation rate of iron increases rapidly beyond 800 °C (1,470 °F), it is important that smelting takes place in a low-oxygen environment. Smelting, using carbon to reduce iron oxides, results in an alloy (pig iron) that retains too much carbon to be called steel. The excess carbon and other impurities are removed via further processing.

Other materials are often added to the iron/carbon mixture to produce steel with the desired properties. Nickel and manganese in steel add to its tensile strength and make the austenite form of the iron-carbon solution more stable, chromium increases hardness and melting temperature, and vanadium also increases hardness while making it less prone to metal fatigue.

To inhibit corrosion, at least 11% chromium can be added to steel so that a hard oxide forms on the metal surface; this is known as stainless steel. Tungsten slows the formation of cementite, keeping carbon in the iron matrix and allowing martensite to preferentially form at slower quench rates, resulting in high-speed steel. The addition of lead and sulphur decrease grain size, thereby making the steel easier to turn, but also more brittle and prone to corrosion. Such alloys are nevertheless frequently used for components such as nuts, bolts, and washers in applications where toughness and corrosion resistance are not paramount. For the most part, however, p-block elements such as sulphur, nitrogen, phosphorus, and lead are considered contaminants that make steel more brittle and are therefore removed from steel during the melting processing.

=== Properties ===
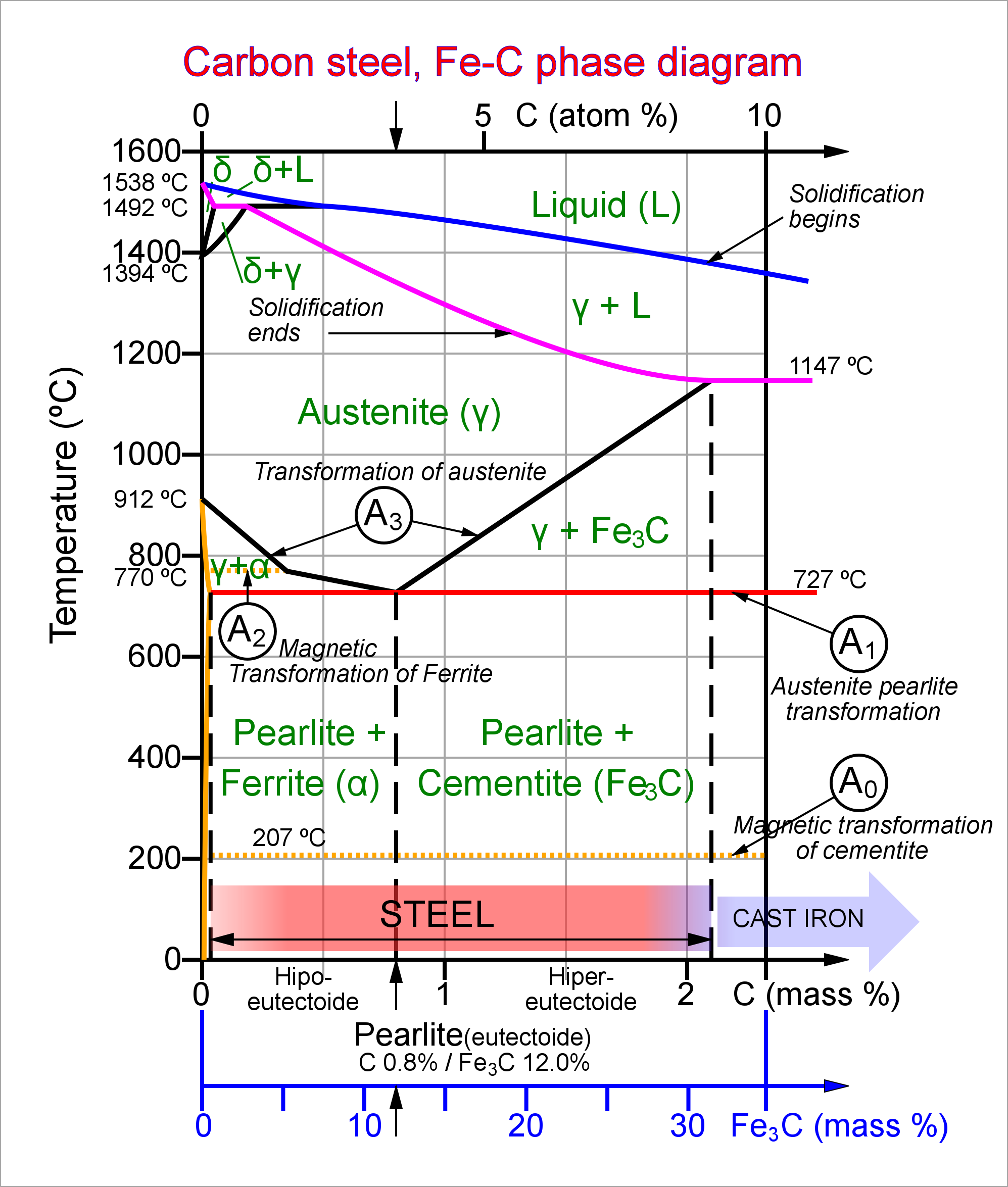
Fe-C phase diagram for carbon steels, showing the A_{0}, A_{1}, A_{2} and A_{3} critical temperatures for heat treatments

The density of steel varies based on the alloying constituents but usually ranges between 7,750 and 8,050 kg/m^{3} (484 and 503 lb/cu ft), or 7.75 and 8.05 g/cm^{3} (4.48 and 4.65 oz/cu in).

Even in a narrow range of concentrations of mixtures of carbon and iron that make steel, several different metallurgical structures, with very different properties can form. Understanding such properties is essential to making quality steel. At room temperature, the most stable form of pure iron is the body-centred cubic (BCC) structure called alpha iron or α-iron. It is a fairly soft metal that can dissolve only a small concentration of carbon, no more than 0.005% at 0 °C (32 °F) and 0.021 wt% at 723 °C (1,333 °F). The inclusion of carbon in alpha iron is called ferrite. At 910 °C, pure iron transforms into a face-centred cubic (FCC) structure, called gamma iron or γ-iron. The inclusion of carbon in gamma iron is called austenite. The more open FCC structure of austenite can dissolve considerably more carbon, as much as 2.1% (38 times that of ferrite), at 1,148 °C (2,098 °F), which reflects the upper carbon content of steel, beyond which is cast iron. When carbon moves out of solution with iron, it forms a very hard, but brittle material called cementite (Fe_{3}C).

When steels with exactly 0.8% carbon (known as a eutectoid steel), are cooled, the austenitic phase (FCC) of the mixture attempts to revert to the ferrite phase (BCC). The carbon no longer fits within the FCC austenite structure, resulting in an excess of carbon. One way for carbon to leave the austenite is for it to precipitate out of solution as cementite, leaving behind a surrounding phase of BCC iron called ferrite with a small percentage of carbon in solution. The two, cementite and ferrite, precipitate simultaneously producing a layered structure called pearlite, named for its resemblance to mother of pearl. In a hypereutectoid composition (greater than 0.8% carbon), the carbon will first precipitate out as large inclusions of cementite at the austenite grain boundaries until the percentage of carbon in the grains has decreased to the eutectoid composition (0.8% carbon), at which point the pearlite structure forms. For steels that have less than 0.8% carbon (hypoeutectoid), ferrite will first form within the grains until the remaining composition rises to 0.8% of carbon, at which point the pearlite structure will form. No large inclusions of cementite will form at the boundaries in hypoeutectoid steel. The above assumes that the cooling process is very slow, allowing enough time for the carbon to migrate.

As the rate of cooling is increased the carbon will have less time to migrate to form carbide at the grain boundaries but will have increasingly large amounts of pearlite of a finer and finer structure within the grains; hence the carbide is more widely dispersed and acts to prevent slip of defects within those grains, resulting in hardening of the steel. At the very high cooling rates produced by quenching, the carbon has no time to migrate but is locked within the face-centred austenite and forms martensite. Martensite is a highly strained and stressed, supersaturated form of carbon and iron and is exceedingly hard but brittle. Depending on the carbon content, the martensitic phase takes different forms. Below 0.2% carbon, it takes on a ferrite BCC crystal form, but at higher carbon content it takes a body-centred tetragonal (BCT) structure. There is no thermal activation energy barrier which prevents transformation from austenite to martensite. There is no compositional change, so the atoms generally retain their same neighbours.

Martensite has a lower density (it expands during the cooling) than does austenite, so that the transformation between them results in a change of volume. In this case, expansion occurs. Internal stresses from this expansion generally take the form of compression on the crystals of martensite and tension on the remaining ferrite, with a fair amount of shear on both constituents. If quenching is done improperly, the internal stresses can cause a part to shatter as it cools. At the very least, they cause internal work hardening and other microscopic imperfections. It is common for quench cracks to form when steel is water quenched, although they may not always be visible.

=== Heat treatment ===
There are many types of heat treating processes available to steel, such as annealing, quenching, and tempering.

Annealing is the process of heating the steel to a sufficiently high temperature to relieve local internal stresses. It does not create a general softening of the product but only locally relieves strains and stresses locked up within the material. Annealing goes through three phases: recovery, recrystallization, and grain growth. The temperature required to anneal a particular steel depends on the type of annealing to be achieved and the alloying constituents.

Quenching involves heating the steel to create the austenite phase then quenching it in water or oil. This rapid cooling results in a hard but brittle martensitic structure. The steel is then tempered, which is just a specialized type of annealing, to reduce brittleness. In this application the annealing (tempering) process transforms some of the martensite into cementite, or spheroidite, and hence it reduces the internal stresses and defects. The result is a more ductile and fracture-resistant steel.

== History ==
=== Ancient ===
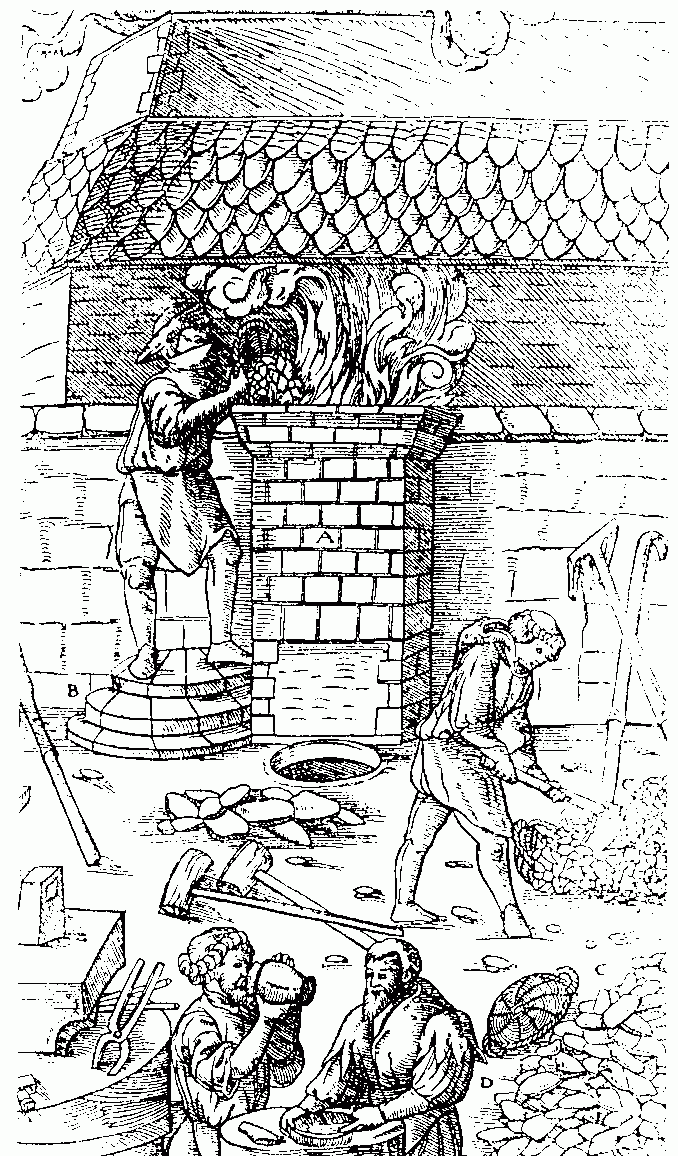
Bloomery smelting during the Middle Ages in the 5th to 15th centuries

Steel was known in antiquity and was produced in bloomeries and crucibles.

The earliest known production of steel is seen in pieces of ironware excavated from an archaeological site in Anatolia (Kaman-Kalehöyük) which are nearly 4,000 years old, dating from 1800 BC.

Wootz steel was developed in Southern India and Sri Lanka in the 1st millennium BC. Metal production sites in Sri Lanka employed wind furnaces driven by the monsoon winds, capable of producing high-carbon steel. Large-scale wootz steel production in India using crucibles occurred by the sixth century BC, the pioneering precursor to modern steel production and metallurgy.

High-carbon steel was produced in Britain at Broxmouth Hillfort from 490 to 375 BC, and ultrahigh-carbon steel was produced in the Netherlands from the 2nd to 4th centuries AD. The Roman author Horace identifies steel weapons such as the falcata in the Iberian Peninsula, while Noric steel was used by the Roman military.

The Chinese of the Warring States period (403–221 BC) had quench-hardened steel, while Chinese of the Han dynasty (202 BC – AD 220) created steel by melting together wrought iron with cast iron, thus producing a carbon-intermediate steel by the 1st century AD.

There is evidence that carbon steel was made in Western Tanzania by the ancestors of the Haya people as early as 2,000 years ago by a complex process of "pre-heating" allowing temperatures inside a furnace to reach 1300 to 1400 °C.

=== Wootz and Damascus ===
Evidence of the earliest production of high-carbon steel in South Asia is found in Kodumanal in Tamil Nadu, the Golconda area in Telangana and Karnataka, regions of India, as well as in Samanalawewa and Dehigaha Alakanda, regions of Sri Lanka. This came to be known as wootz steel, produced in South India by about the sixth century BC and exported globally. The steel technology existed prior to 326 BC in the region as they are mentioned in literature of Sangam Tamil, Arabic, and Latin as the finest steel in the world exported to the Roman, Egyptian, Chinese and Arab worlds at that time – what they called Seric iron. A 200 BC Tamil trade guild in Tissamaharama, in the South East of Sri Lanka, brought with them some of the oldest iron and steel artifacts and production processes to the island from the classical period. The Chinese and locals in Anuradhapura, Sri Lanka had also adopted the production methods of creating wootz steel from the Chera Dynasty Tamils of South India by the 5th century AD. In Sri Lanka, this early steel-making method employed a unique wind furnace, driven by the monsoon winds, capable of producing high-carbon steel. Since the technology was acquired from the Tamilians from South India, the origin of steel technology in India can be conservatively estimated at 400–500 BC.

The manufacture of wootz steel and Damascus steel, famous for its durability and ability to hold an edge, may have been taken by the Arabs from Persia, who took it from India. In 327 BC, Alexander the Great was rewarded by the defeated King Porus, not with gold or silver but with 30 pounds of steel. The Greek alchemist Zosimos of Panopolis attested to the Indian origin of wootz steel, stating that "Indians made high quality swords by melting soft iron in crucibles." A recent study has speculated that carbon nanotubes were included in its structure, which might explain some of its legendary qualities, though, given the technology of that time, such qualities were produced by chance rather than by design. Natural wind was used where the soil containing iron was heated by the use of wood. The ancient Sinhalese managed to extract a ton of steel for every 2 tons of soil, a remarkable feat at the time. One such furnace was found in Samanalawewa and archaeologists were able to produce steel as the ancients did.

Crucible steel, formed by slowly heating and cooling pure iron and carbon (typically in the form of charcoal) in a crucible, was produced in Merv by the 9th to 10th century AD. In the 11th century, there is evidence of the production of steel in Song China using two techniques: a "berganesque" method that produced inferior, inhomogeneous steel, and a precursor to the modern Bessemer process that used partial decarburization via repeated forging under a cold blast.

=== Modern ===
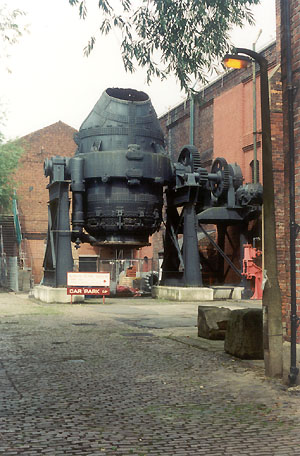
A Bessemer converter in Sheffield, England

Since the 17th century, the first step in European steel production has been the smelting of iron ore into pig iron in a blast furnace. Originally employing charcoal, modern methods use coke, which has proven more economical.

==== Processes starting from bar iron ====
In these processes, pig iron made from raw iron ore was refined (fined) in a finery forge to produce bar iron, which was then used in steel-making.

The production of steel by the cementation process was described in a treatise published in Prague in 1574 and was in use in Nuremberg from 1601. A similar process for case hardening armour and files was described in a book published in Naples in 1589. The process was introduced to England in about 1614 and used to produce such steel by Sir Basil Brooke at Coalbrookdale during the 1610s.

The raw material for this process were bars of iron. During the 17th century, it was realized that the best steel came from oregrounds iron of a region north of Stockholm, Sweden. This was still the usual raw material source in the 19th century, almost as long as the process was used.

Crucible steel is steel that has been melted in a crucible rather than having been forged, with the result that it is more homogeneous. Most previous furnaces could not reach high enough temperatures to melt the steel. The early modern crucible steel industry resulted from the invention of Benjamin Huntsman in the 1740s. Blister steel (made as above) was melted in a crucible or in a furnace, and cast (usually) into ingots.

==== Processes starting from pig iron ====
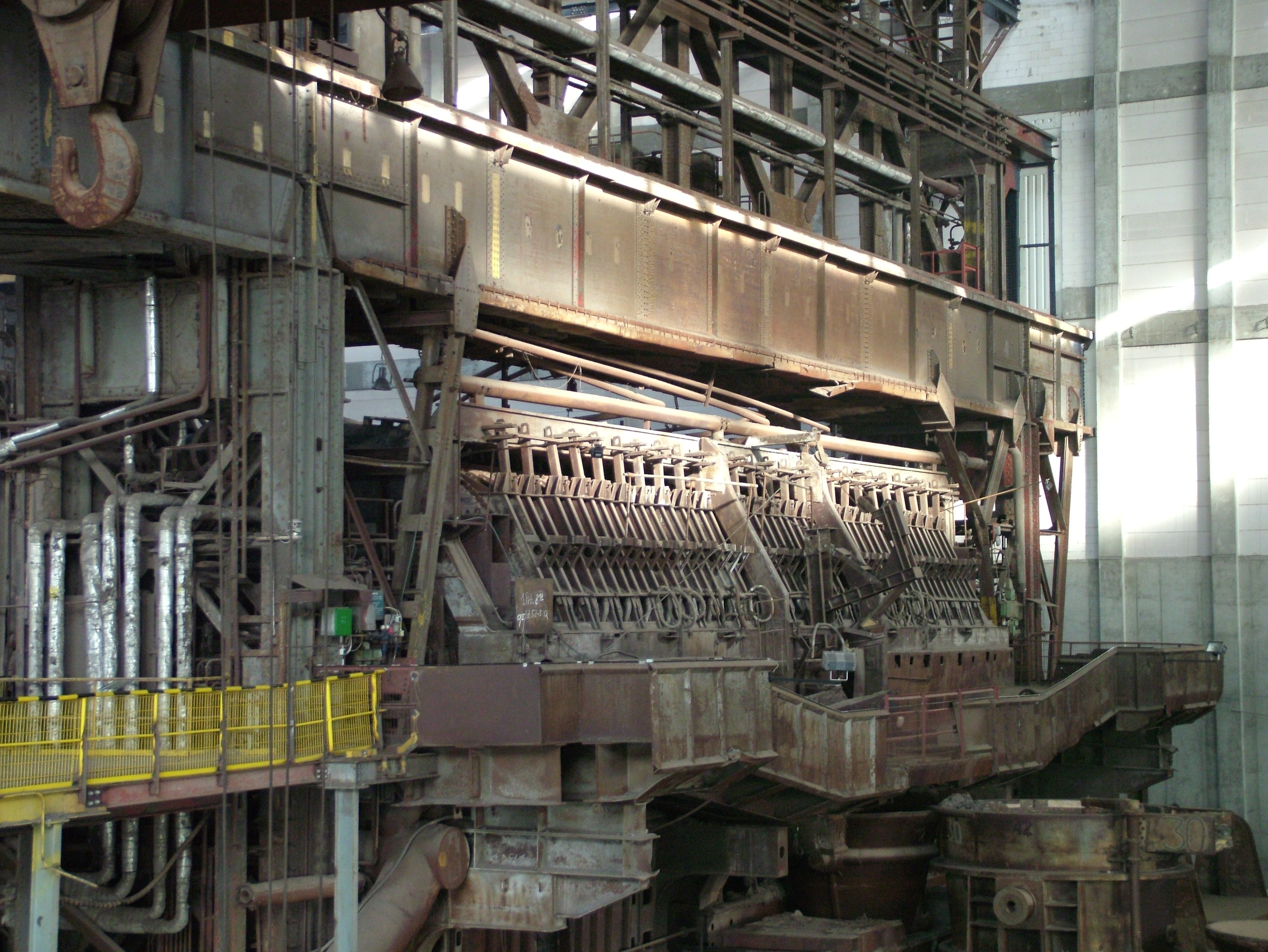
An open hearth furnace in the Museum of Industry in Brandenburg, Germany

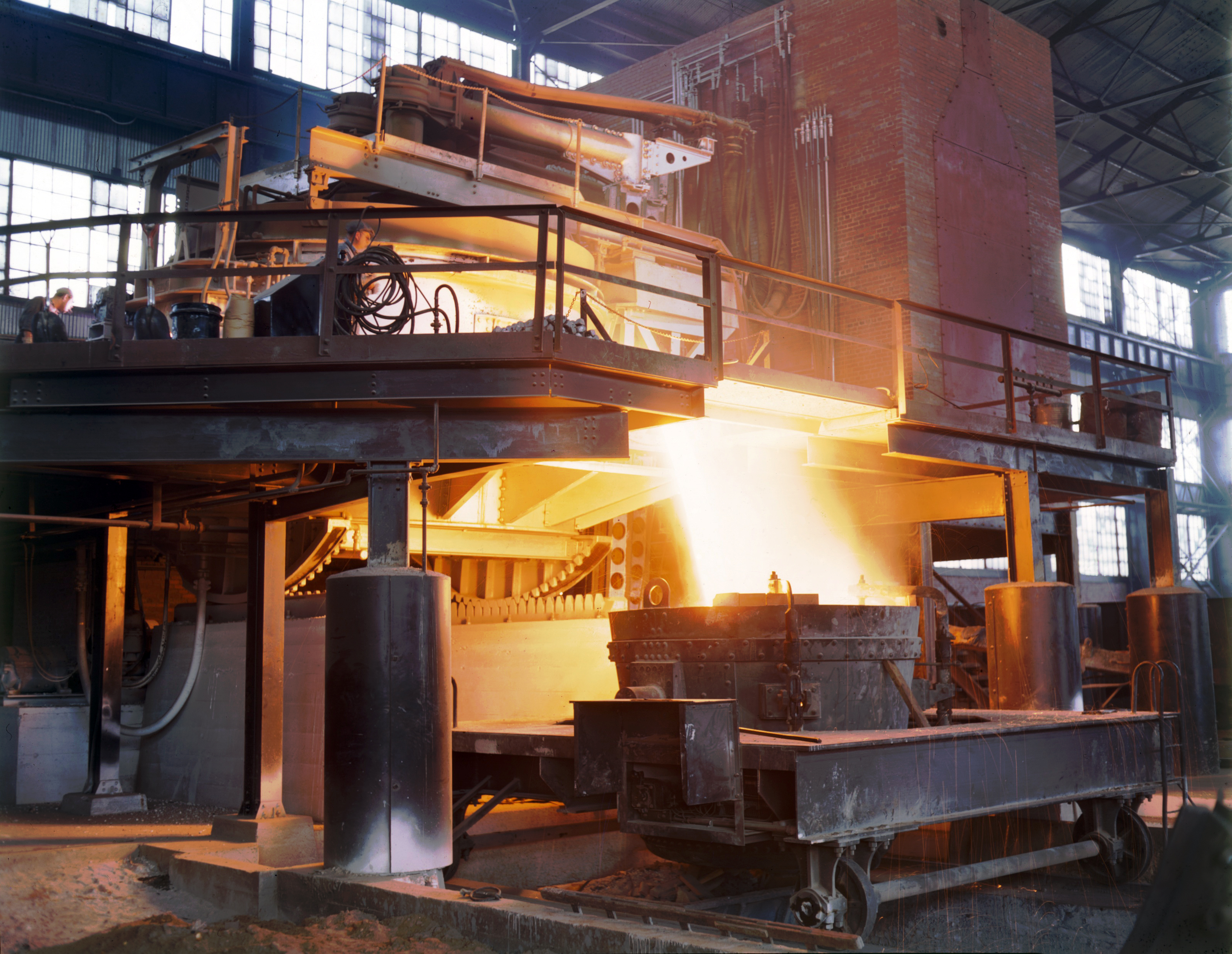
White-hot steel pouring out of an electric arc furnace in Brackenridge, Pennsylvania

The modern era in steelmaking began with the introduction of Henry Bessemer's process in 1855, the raw material for which was pig iron. His method let him produce steel in large quantities cheaply, thus mild steel came to be used for most purposes for which wrought iron was formerly used. The Gilchrist-Thomas process (or basic Bessemer process) was an improvement to the Bessemer process, made by lining the converter with a basic material to remove phosphorus.

Another 19th-century steelmaking process was the Siemens-Martin process, which complemented the Bessemer process, which originally consisted of co-melting wrought-iron scrap with pig iron.

These methods of steel production were rendered obsolete by the Linz-Donawitz process of basic oxygen steelmaking (BOS), developed in 1952, and other oxygen steel making methods. Basic oxygen steelmaking is superior to previous steelmaking methods because the oxygen pumped into the furnace limited impurities, primarily nitrogen, that previously had entered from the air used, and because, with respect to the open hearth process, the same quantity of steel from a BOS process is manufactured in one-twelfth the time. Today, electric arc furnaces (EAF) are a common method of reprocessing scrap metal to create new steel. They can also be used for converting pig iron to steel, but they use a lot of electrical energy (about 440 kWh per metric ton), and are thus generally only economical when there is a plentiful supply of cheap electricity.

== Industry ==
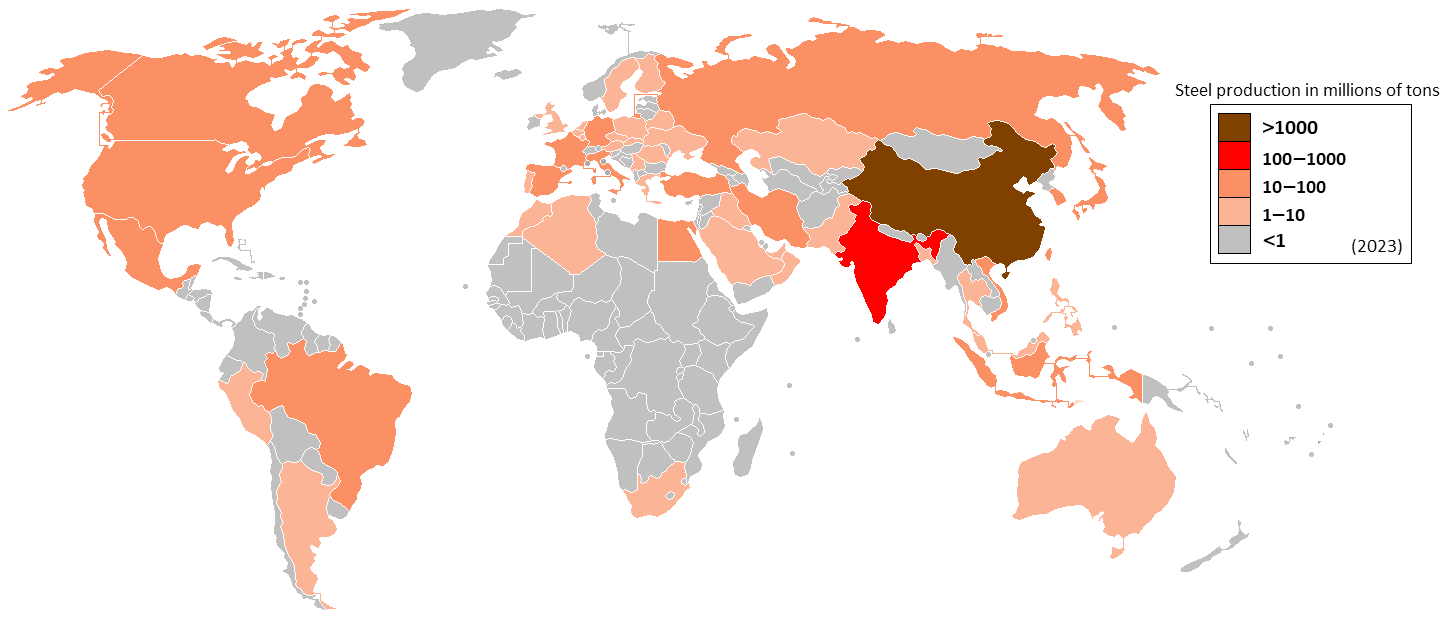
Steel production (in million tons) by country as of 2023

The steel industry is often considered an indicator of economic progress, because of the critical role played by steel in infrastructural and overall economic development. In 1980, there were more than 500,000 U.S. steelworkers. By 2000, the number of steelworkers had fallen to 224,000.

The economic boom in China and India caused a massive increase in the demand for steel. Between 2000 and 2005, world steel demand increased by 6%. Since 2000, several Indian and Chinese steel firms have expanded to meet demand, such as Tata Steel, Baowu Steel and Ansteel Group. As of 2025, Baowu is the world's largest steel producer, followed by ArcelorMittal and Nippon Steel.

In 2005, the British Geological Survey stated China was the top steel producer with about one-third of the world share; Japan, Russia, and the United States were second, third, and fourth, respectively, according to the survey. Steelmaking is a significant contributor to climate change, accounting for around 7% of global greenhouse gas emissions as of 2024. Potential ways to reduce emissions include replacing coke-based production methods with hydrogen, increasing recycling of steel, and applying carbon capture and storage technology.

== Recycling ==
Steel is one of the world's most-recycled materials, with a recycling rate of over 60% globally; in the United States alone, over 82,000,000 metric tons (81,000,000 long tons; 90,000,000 short tons) were recycled in the year 2008, for an overall recycling rate of 83%.

As more steel is produced than is scrapped, the amount of recycled raw materials is about 40% of the total of steel produced – in 2016, 1,628,000,000 tonnes (1.602×10^{9} long tons; 1.795×10^{9} short tons) of crude steel was produced globally, with 630,000,000 tonnes (620,000,000 long tons; 690,000,000 short tons) recycled.

== Contemporary ==
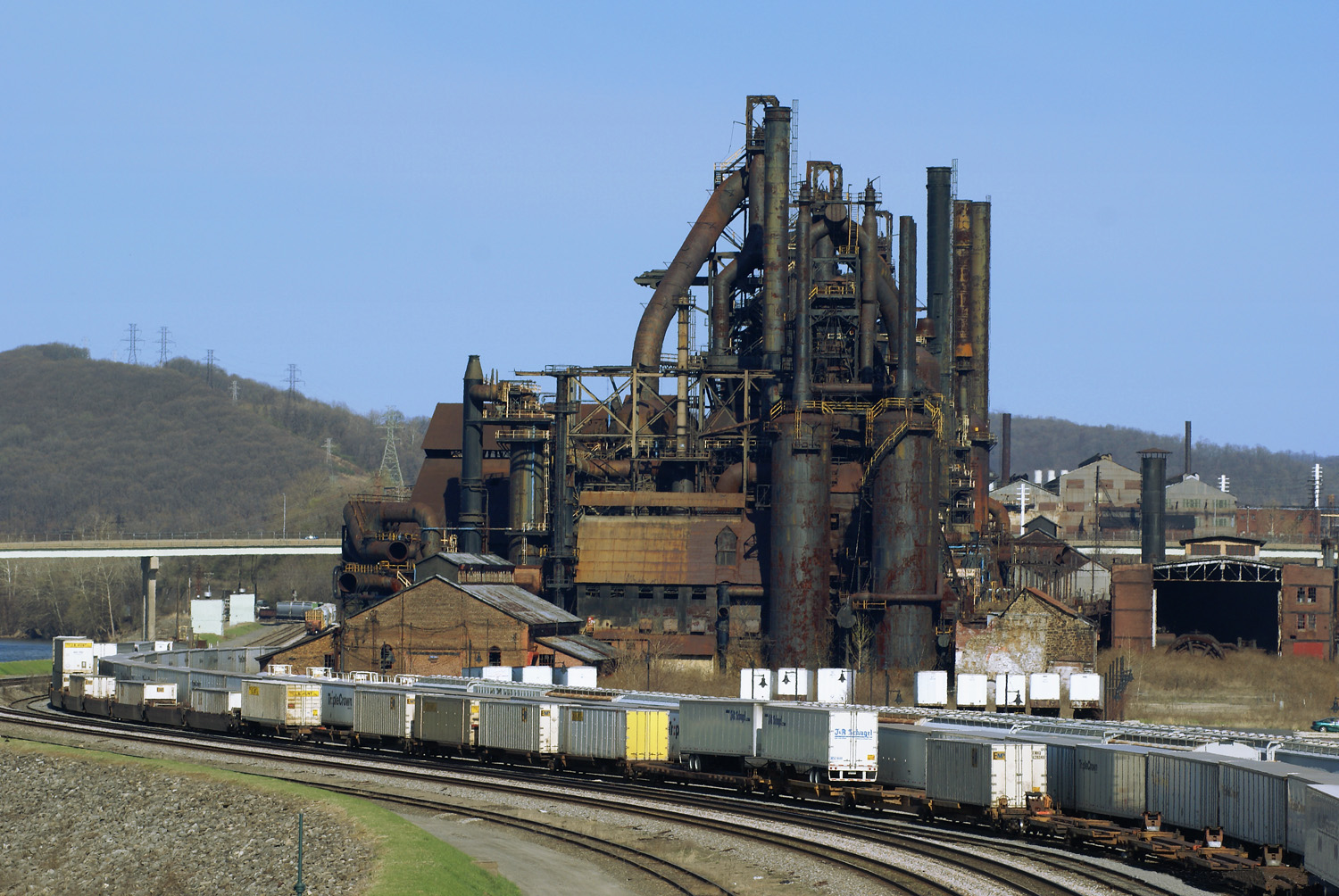
Bethlehem Steel in Bethlehem, Pennsylvania was one of the world's largest manufacturers of steel before its closure in 2003

=== Carbon ===
Modern steels are made with varying combinations of alloy metals to fulfil many purposes. Carbon steel, composed simply of iron and carbon, accounts for 90% of steel production. Low alloy steel is alloyed with other elements, usually molybdenum, manganese, chromium, or nickel, in amounts of up to 10% by weight to improve the hardenability of thick sections. High strength low alloy steel has small additions (usually less than 2% by weight) of other elements, typically 1.5% manganese, to provide additional strength for a modest price increase.

Recent corporate average fuel economy (CAFE) regulations have given rise to a new variety of steel known as Advanced High Strength Steel (AHSS). This material is both strong and ductile so that vehicle structures can maintain their current safety levels while using less material. There are several commercially available grades of AHSS, such as dual-phase steel, which is heat treated to contain both a ferritic and martensitic microstructure to produce a formable, high strength steel. Transformation Induced Plasticity (TRIP) steel involves special alloying and heat treatments to stabilize amounts of austenite at room temperature in normally austenite-free low-alloy ferritic steels. By applying strain, the austenite undergoes a phase transition to martensite without the addition of heat. Twinning Induced Plasticity (TWIP) steel uses a specific type of strain to increase the effectiveness of work hardening on the alloy.

Carbon steels are often galvanized, through hot-dip or electroplating in zinc for protection against rust.

=== Alloy ===
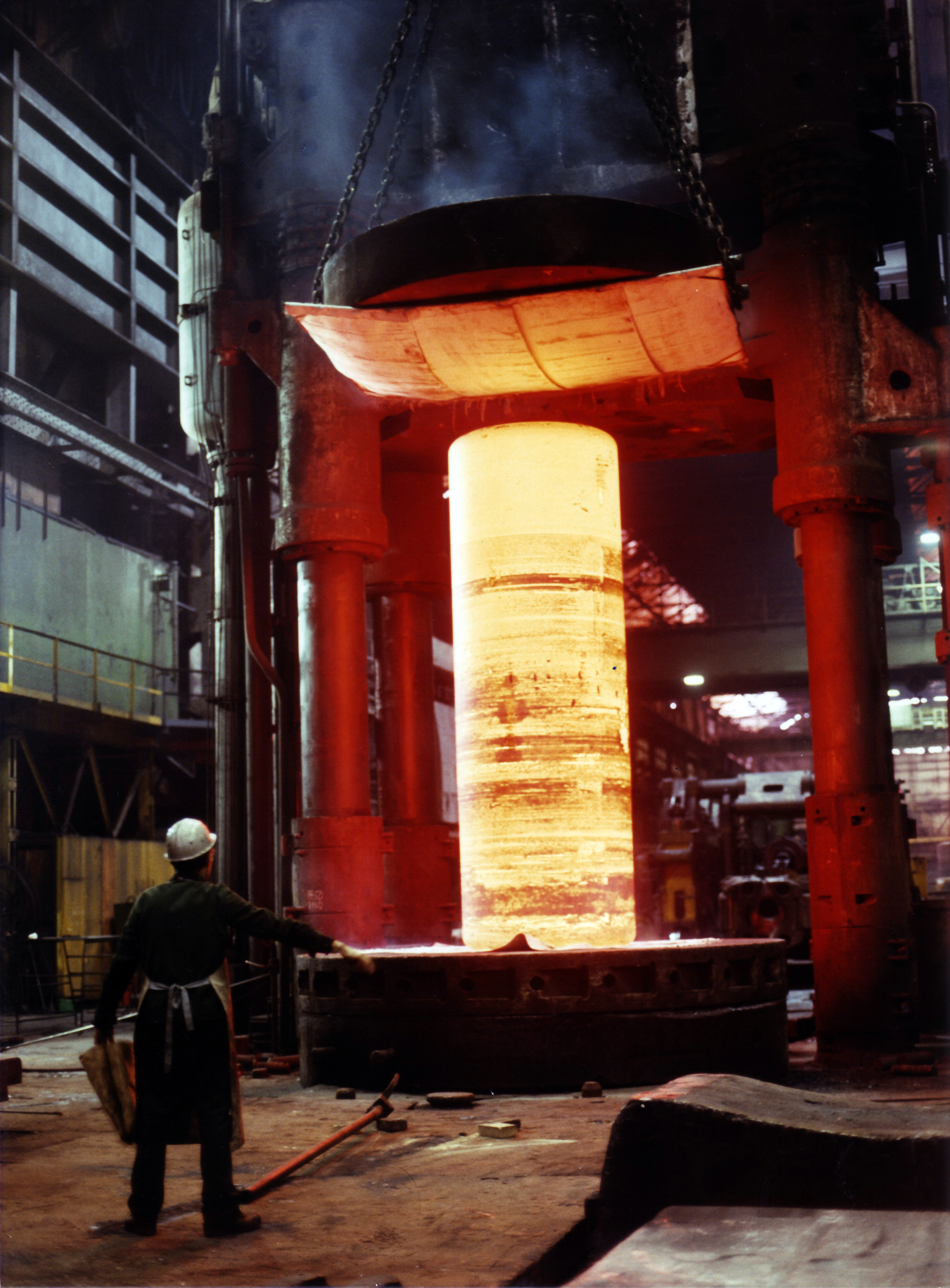
Forging a structural member out of steel

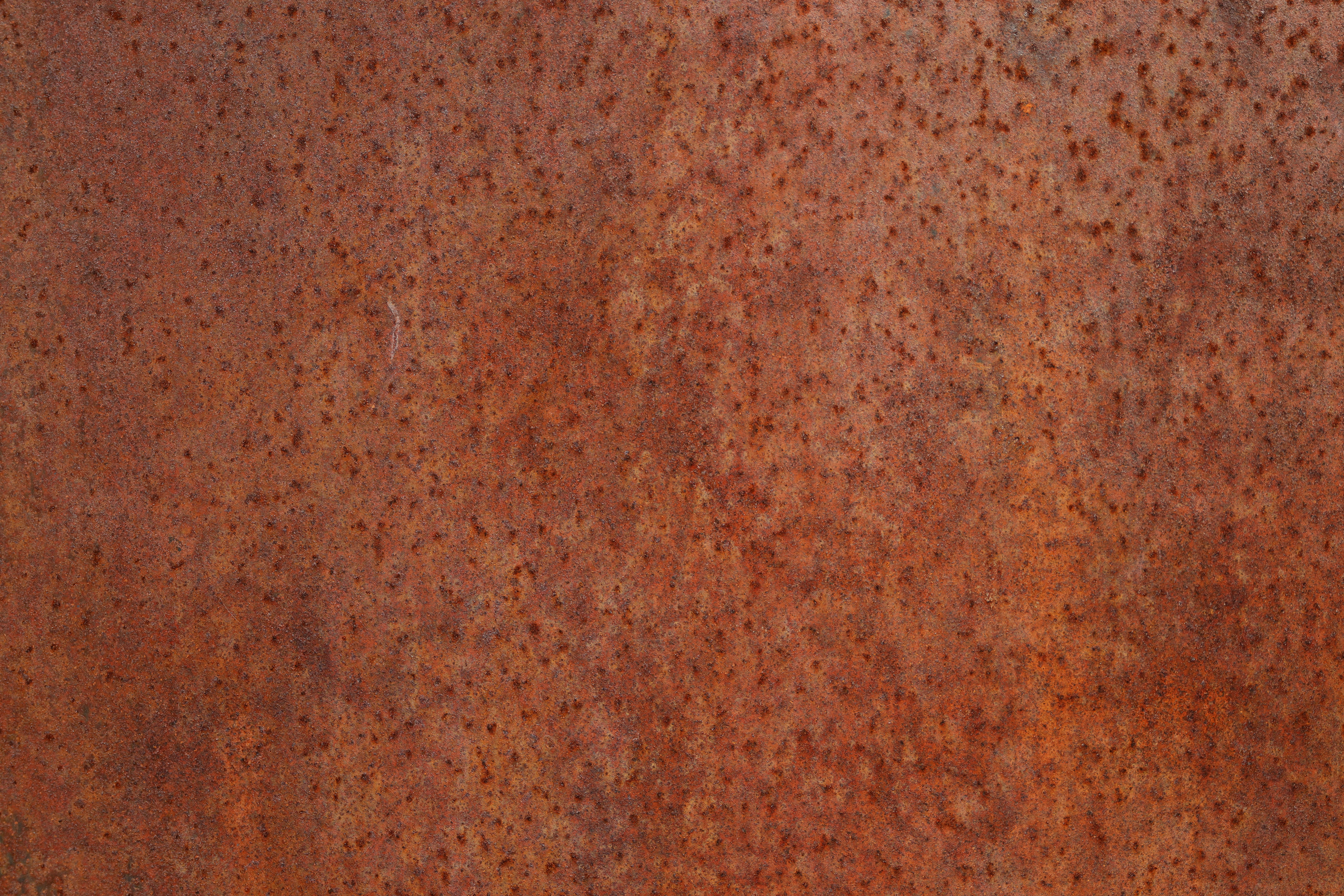
Cor-Ten rust coating

Stainless steel contains a minimum of 11% chromium, often combined with nickel, to resist corrosion. Some stainless steels, such as the ferritic stainless steels are magnetic, while others, such as the austenitic, are nonmagnetic. Corrosion-resistant steels are abbreviated as CRES.

Alloy steels are plain-carbon steels in which small amounts of alloying elements like chromium and vanadium have been added. Some more modern steels include tool steels, which are alloyed with large amounts of tungsten and cobalt or other elements to maximize solution hardening. This also allows the use of precipitation hardening and improves the alloy's temperature resistance. Tool steel is generally used in axes, drills, and other devices that need a sharp, long-lasting cutting edge. Other special-purpose alloys include weathering steels such as Cor-ten, which weather by acquiring a stable, rusted surface, and so can be used un-painted. Maraging steel is alloyed with nickel and other elements, but unlike most steel contains little carbon (0.01%). This creates a very strong but still malleable steel.

Eglin steel uses a combination of over a dozen different elements in varying amounts to create a relatively low-cost steel for use in bunker buster weapons. Hadfield steel, named after Robert Hadfield, or manganese steel, contains 12–14% manganese which, when abraded, strain-hardens to form a very hard skin which resists wearing. Uses of this particular alloy include tank tracks, bulldozer blade edges, and cutting blades on the jaws of life.

=== Standards ===
Most of the more commonly used steel alloys are categorized into various grades by standards organizations. For example, the Society of Automotive Engineers has a series of grades defining many types of steel. The American Society for Testing and Materials has a separate set of standards, which define alloys such as A36 steel, the most commonly used structural steel in the United States. The JIS also defines a series of steel grades that are used extensively in Japan and surrounding countries.

== Uses ==
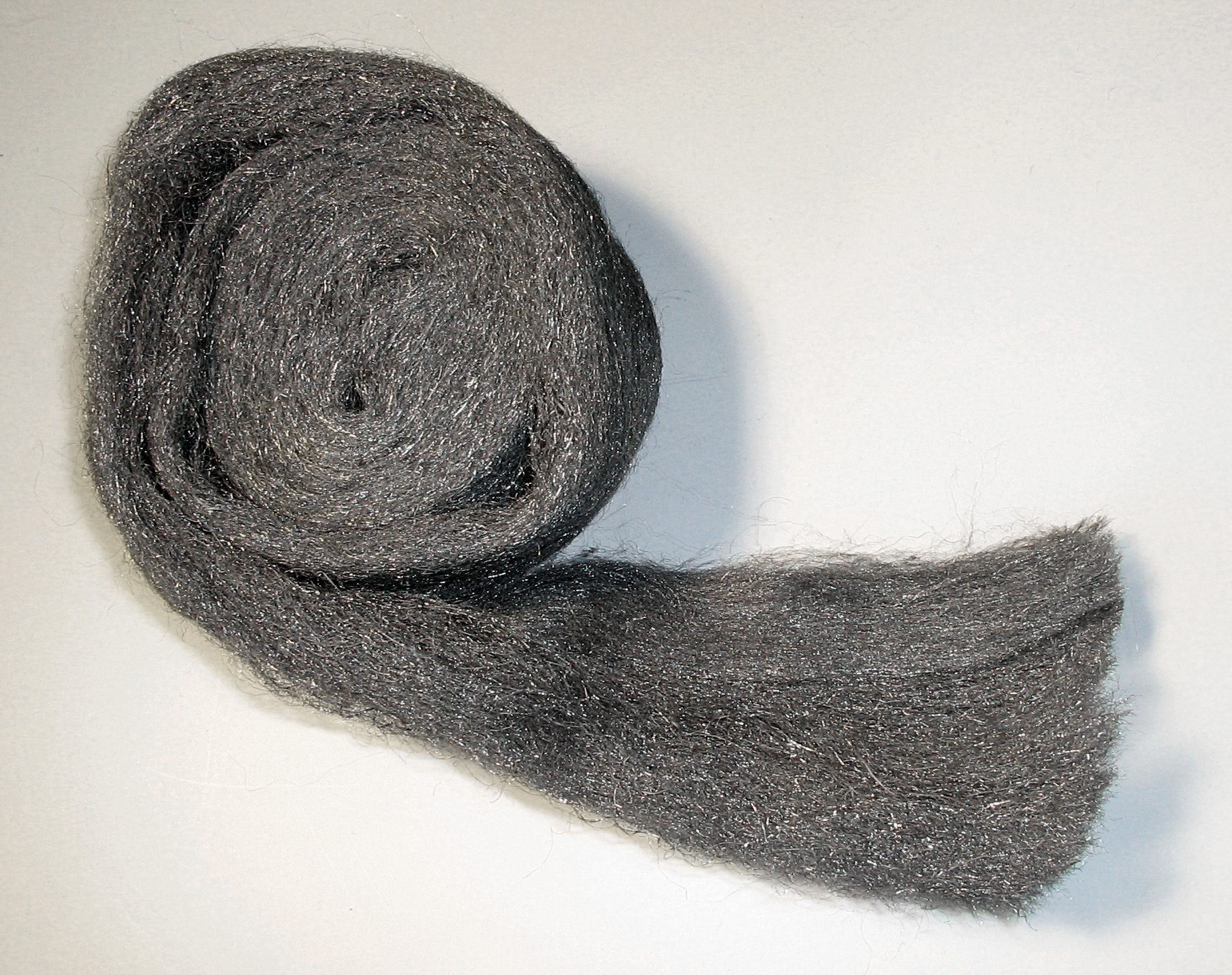
A roll of steel wool

Iron and steel are used widely in the construction of roads, railways, other infrastructure, appliances, and buildings. Most large modern structures, such as stadiums and skyscrapers, bridges, and airports, are supported by a steel skeleton. Even those with a concrete structure employ steel for reinforcing. It sees widespread use in major appliances and cars. Despite the growth in usage of aluminium, steel is still the main material for car bodies. Steel is used in a variety of other construction materials, such as bolts, nails and screws, and other household products and cooking utensils.

Other common applications include shipbuilding, pipelines, mining, offshore construction, aerospace, white goods (e.g. washing machines), heavy equipment such as bulldozers, office furniture, steel wool, tool, and armour in the form of personal vests and helmets or vehicle armour (better known as rolled homogeneous armour in this role).

=== Historical ===
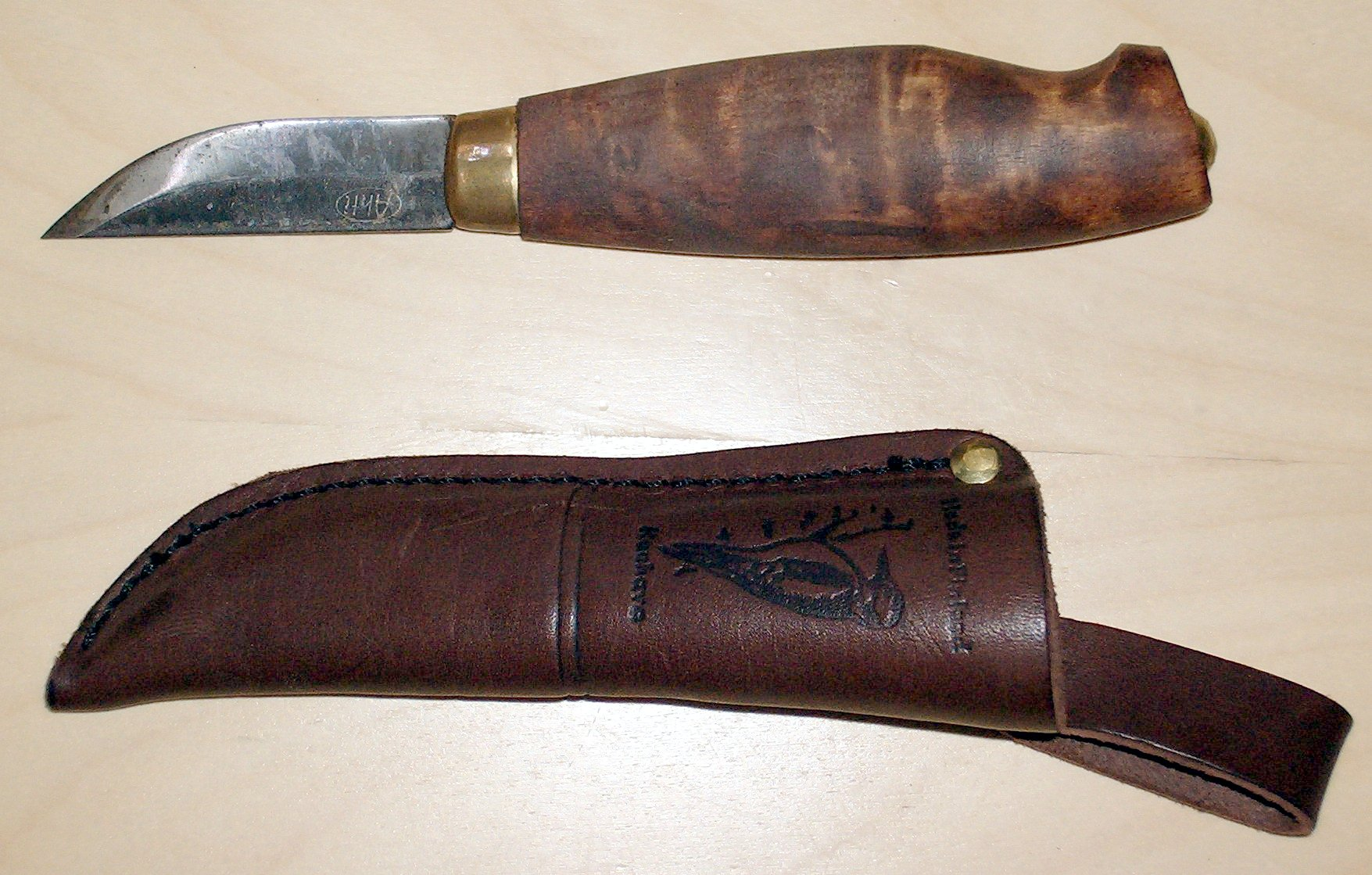
A carbon steel knife

Before the introduction of the Bessemer process and other modern production techniques, steel was expensive and was only used where no cheaper alternative existed, particularly for the cutting edge of knives, razors, swords, and other items where a hard, sharp edge was needed. It was also used for springs, including those used in clocks and watches.

With the advent of faster and cheaper production methods, steel has become easier to obtain and much cheaper. It has replaced wrought iron for a multitude of purposes. However, the availability of plastics in the latter part of the 20th century allowed these materials to replace steel in some applications due to their lower fabrication cost and weight. Carbon fibre is replacing steel in reinforcement-based applications owing to its high modulus value (up to 5 times higher than steel), but its high cost is a barrier to widespread use in transportation.

=== Long ===
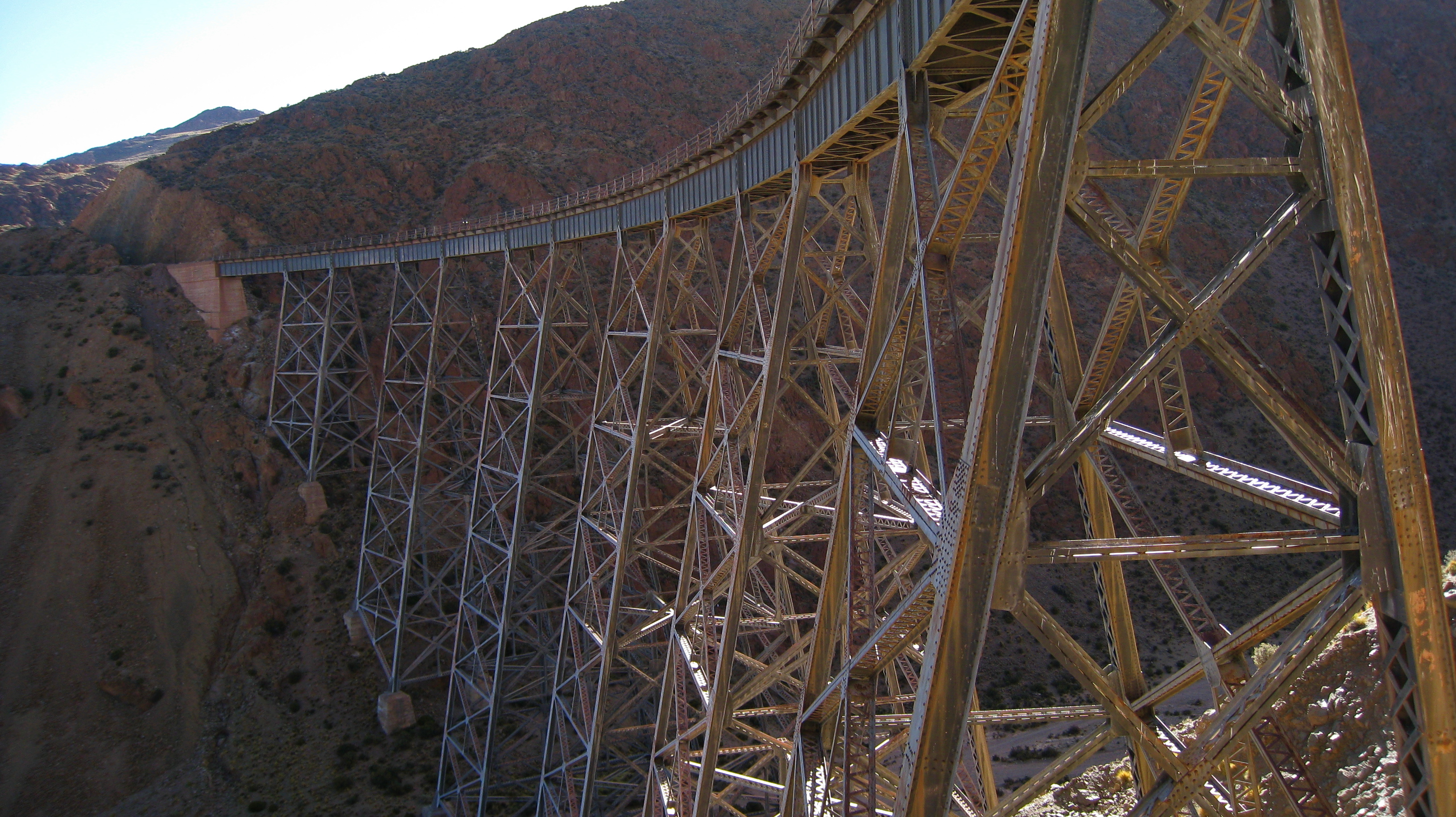
A steel bridge

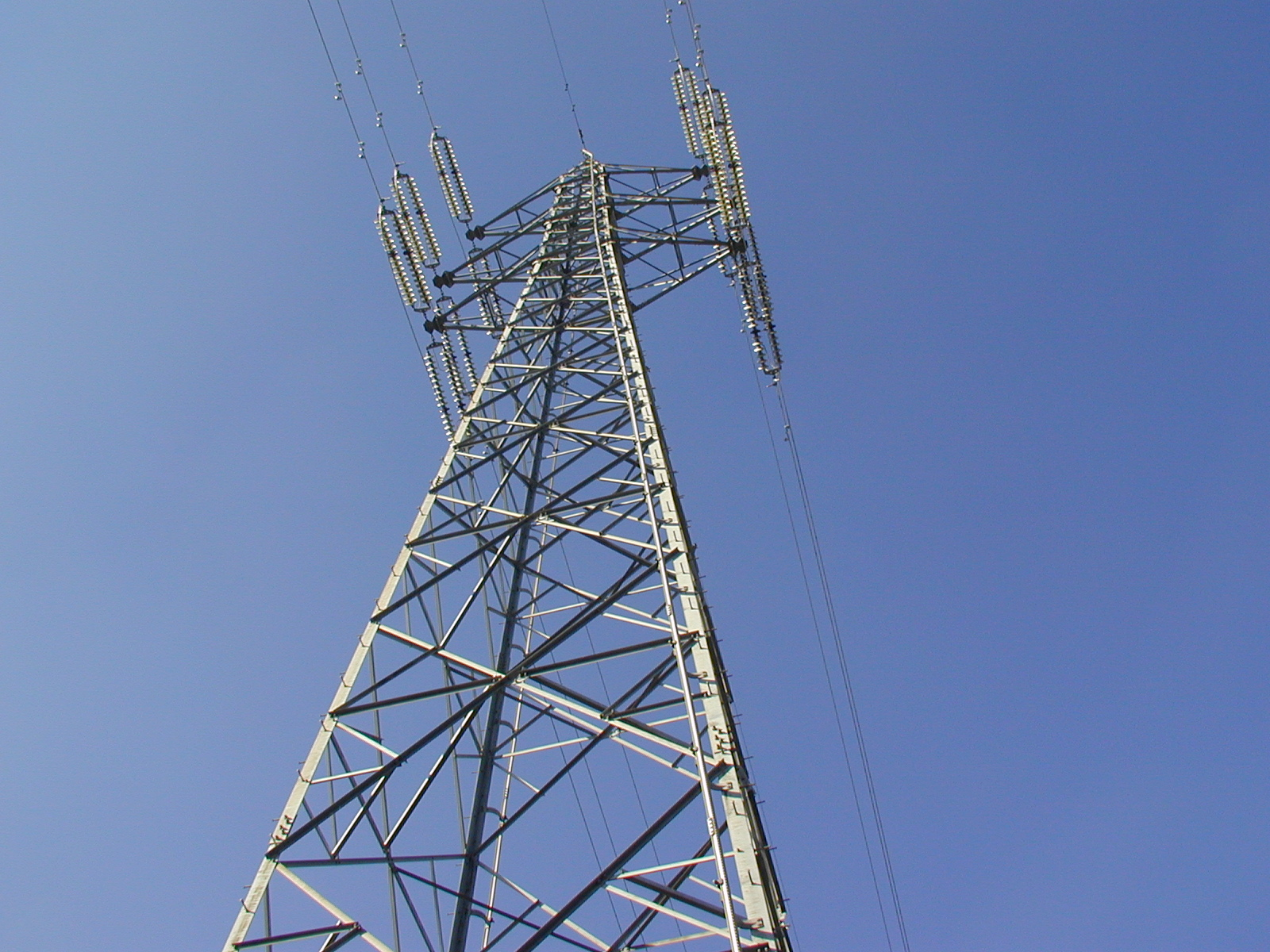
A steel pylon suspending overhead power lines

- As reinforcing bars and mesh in reinforced concrete
- Railroad tracks
- Structural steel in modern buildings and bridges
- Wires
- Input to reforging applications

=== Flat carbon ===
- Major appliances
- Magnetic cores
- The inside and outside body of automobiles, trains, and ships.

=== Weathering (COR-TEN) ===
- Intermodal containers
- Outdoor sculptures
- Architecture

=== Stainless ===
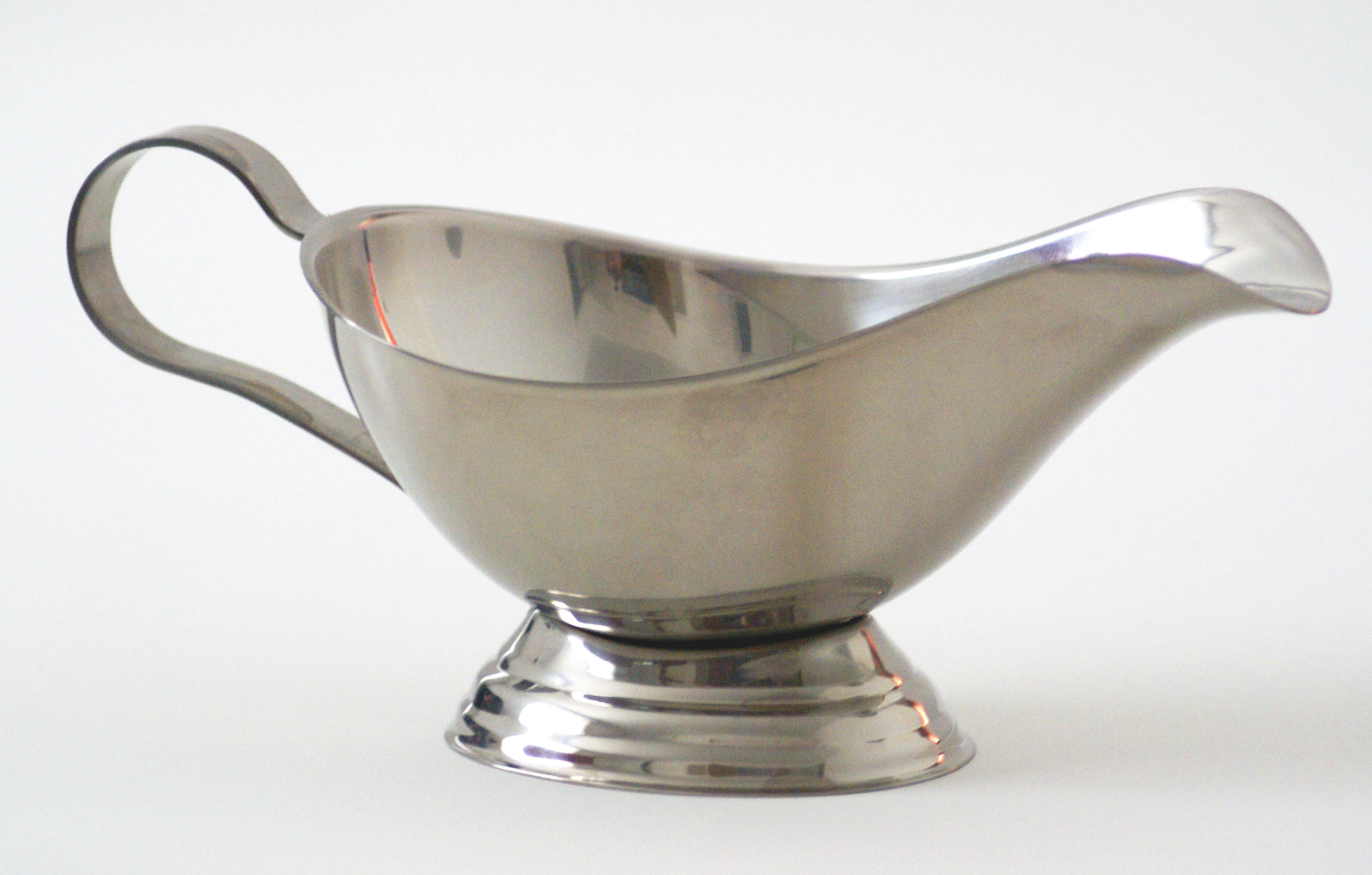
A stainless steel gravy boat

- Cutlery
- Surgical instruments
- Watches
- Guns
- Rail passenger vehicles
- Jewellery
- Components of spacecraft and space stations

=== Low-background ===
Steel manufactured after World War II is contaminated with radionuclides, because steel production uses air, and the atmosphere is contaminated with radioactive dust produced by nuclear weapons testing. Low-background steel, steel manufactured prior to 1945, is used for certain radiation-sensitive applications such as Geiger counters and radiation shielding.

== See also ==
- Bulat steel
- Direct reduction
- Carbon steel
- Damascus steel
- Galvanizing
- History of the steel industry (1970–present)
- Iron in folklore
- Machinability
- Noric steel
- Pelletizing
- Rolling
- Rolling mill
- Rust Belt
- Second Industrial Revolution
- Silicon steel
- Steel abrasive
- Steel mill
- Tamahagane, used in Japanese swords
- Tinplate
- Toledo steel
- Wootz steel
