= Armour plate =

Armour plate or armor plate may refer to various types of

- naval armour or
- vehicle armour
