= Dual-phase steel =

Type of steel with a ferritic–martensitic microstructure

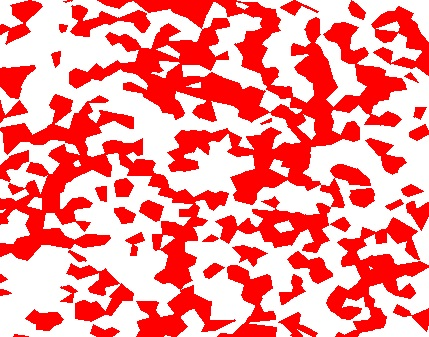
Virtually generated microstructure of dual-phase steel.

Dual-phase steel (DP steel) is a high-strength steel that has a ferritic–martensitic microstructure. DP steels are produced from low or medium carbon steels that are quenched from a temperature above A_{1} but below A_{3} determined from continuous cooling transformation diagram. This results in a microstructure consisting of a soft ferrite matrix containing islands of martensite as the secondary phase (martensite increases the tensile strength). Therefore, the overall behaviour of DP steels is governed by the volume fraction, morphology (size, aspect ratio, interconnectivity, etc.), the grain size and the carbon content. For achieving these microstructures, DP steels typically contain 0.06–0.15 wt.% C and 1.5-3% Mn (the former strengthens the martensite, and the latter causes solid solution strengthening in ferrite, while both stabilize the austenite), Cr & Mo (to retard pearlite or bainite formation), Si (to promote ferrite transformation), V and Nb (for precipitation strengthening and microstructure refinement). The desire to produce high strength steels with formability greater than microalloyed steel led to development of DP steels in 2007 by Tata Steel.

DP steels have high ultimate tensile strength (UTS, enabled by the martensite) combined with low initial yielding stress (provided by the ferrite phase), high early-stage strain hardening and macroscopically homogeneous plastic flow (enabled through the absence of Lüders effects). These features render DP steels ideal materials for automotive-related sheet forming operations.

The steel melt is produced in an oxygen top blowing process in the converter, and undergoes an alloy treatment in the secondary metallurgy phase. The product is aluminium-killed steel, with high tensile strength achieved by the composition with manganese, chromium and silicon.

Their advantages are as follows:

- Low yield strength
- Low yield to tensile strength ratio (yield strength / tensile strength = 0.5)
- High initial strain hardening rates
- Good uniform elongation
- A high strain rate sensitivity (the faster it is crushed the more energy it absorbs)
- Good fatigue resistance

Due to these properties DP steels are often used for automotive body panels, wheels, and bumpers.
