= Acicular ferrite =

Steel microstructure characterized by long needle-like grains

Acicular ferrite is a microstructure of ferrite in steel that is characterised by needle-shaped crystallites or grains when viewed in two dimensions. The grains, actually three-dimensional in shape, have a thin lenticular shape. This microstructure is advantageous over other microstructures for steel because of its chaotic ordering, which increases toughness.

Acicular ferrite is formed in the interior of the original austenitic grains by direct nucleation on the inclusions, resulting in randomly oriented short ferrite needles with a 'basket weave' appearance. Acicular ferrite is also characterised by high angle boundaries between the ferrite grains. This further reduces the chance of cleavage, because these boundaries impede crack propagation.

In C-Mn steel weld metals, it is reported that nucleation of various ferrite morphologies is aided by non-metallic inclusion; in particular oxygen-rich inclusions of a certain type and size are associated with the intragranular nucleation of acicular ferrite. Acicular ferrite is a fine Widmanstätten constituent, which is nucleated by an optimum intragranular dispersion of oxide/sulfide/silicate particles. The interlocking nature of acicular ferrite, together with its fine grain size (0.5 to 5 μm with aspect ratio from 3:1 to 10:1), provides maximum resistance to crack propagation by cleavage.

Composition control of weld metal is often performed to maximise the volume fraction of acicular ferrite due to the toughness it imparts. During continuous cooling, higher alloy contents or faster cooling generally delay transformation, which will then take place at lower temperatures, below the bainite start temperature, and lead to higher hardness. The efficacy of inclusions as nucleation sites in modern low alloy steel weld metals is such that fine-scale intragranular bainite can nucleate on them, both by continuous cooling and by isothermal transformation below the bainite start temperature. Some confusion has arisen in the literature, as this fine-scale intragranular bainite, which can resemble acicular ferrite in appearance in the optical microscope, has been called acicular ferrite by some researchers. See, for example.

== See also ==
- Eutectic
- Bainite
- Martensite
