= Hot hardness =

In materials engineering and metallurgy, hot hardness or red hardness (when a metal glows a dull red from the heat) corresponds to hardness of a material at high temperatures. As the temperature of the material increases, hardness decreases and at some point a drastic change in hardness occurs. The hardness at this point is termed the hot or red hardness of that material. Such changes can be seen in materials such as heat treated alloys.

== Temperature dependence ==
Hardness varies with temperature in much the same way as other mechanical properties, such as flow stress. For this reason, hot hardness testing is generally regarded as a useful way to quickly sort the high-temperature strength and creep characteristics of dissimilar solids. Hot hardness may also be correlated with resistance to high-temperature wear, oxidation, erosion, plastic deformation, tempering, aging and creep. In hot hardness studies, temperature is often given as the homologous temperature T/Tₘ, the ratio of the absolute temperature to the melting point.

=== Exponential (Ito-Shishokin) relation ===
The earliest description of hot hardness was proposed by K. Ito in 1923 and V. P. Shishokin in 1930, who arrived at it independently:

$H=H_0e^-^B^T$

Where

- H is the hardness, equivalent to the mean compressive stress beneath the indenter;
- T is the absolute temperature;
- H₀ is the intrinsic hardness, extrapolated to the absolute temperature;
- B is the softening coefficient.

In practice, a single exponential rarely fits the whole temperature range. One pair of constants (H₁, B₁) describes the data at low temperatures and a second pair (H₂, B₂) at high temperatures, which suggests a change in the deformation mechanism. In most metals and alloys the transition between the two regimes occurs at about half the melting temperature. The softening coefficient is inversely related to the melting temperature, so metals with higher melting points have smaller softening coefficients (see table)

| Metal | Tₘ (K) | T/Tₘ Range of Data | B₁ (10⁻⁴ K⁻¹) | B₂ (10⁻⁴ K⁻¹) | Qₗ, kcal/mol (kJ/mol) | Method |
|---|---|---|---|---|---|---|
| Lead | 600 | 0.13-0.87 | 29.0 | 70.0 | 27.9 (117) | Vickers |
| Aluminum | 931 | 0.08-0.94 | 23.3 | 72.0 | 34.0 (142) | Vickers, Brinell |
| Copper | 1356 | 0.05-0.90 | 12.3 | 39.0 | 48.2 (202) | Vickers, cone |
| Nickel | 1728 | 0.01-0.85 | 10.0 | 39.0 | 69.5 (291) | Vickers |
| Molybdenum | 2883 | 0.10-0.78 | 7.3 | 29.1 | 96.9 (405) | Vickers |
| Tungsten | 3683 | 0.04-0.57 | 8.2 | 20.3 | 140.0 (586) | Vickers |

Hot hardness coefficients of selected pure metals. B₁ and B₂ are the softening coefficients in the exponential relation below and above the transition temperature. Qₗ is the activation energy for lattice self diffusion. Data compiled by Merchant et al. (1973).

=== Arrhenius Relation ===
Above the transition temperature, hot hardening can instead be treated as a thermally activated process described by an Arrhenius equation. Sherby and Armstrong derived this form from the power-law equation for steady-state creep of pure metals:

$\dot\varepsilon = K\exp\left(-\frac{Q_L}{RT}\right)\sigma^n$

Where:

- ε̇ is the strain rate and σ is the stress;
- Qₗ is the activation energy for lattice self-diffusion;
- R is the universal gas constant;
- n is the stress exponent;
- K is a material constant.

Sherby and Armstrong applied this equation to ultimate tensile strength measured at constant strain rate. They then used the observed direct proportionality between ultimate tensile strength and hot hardness to obtain:

$H = F\exp\left(\frac{Q_L}{nRT}\right)$

where F is a constant. A plot of ln H against 1/T should therefore be a straight line with slope Qₗ/nR.

== Measurement ==
Hot hardness has been measure with Vickers, cone, and Brinell indenters. Results depend on the indenter, load and indentation time, and on the purity and grain size of the sample. See Vickers hardness test, Brinell hardness test, and Rockwell hardness test.
