= Martensite =

Type of steel crystalline structure

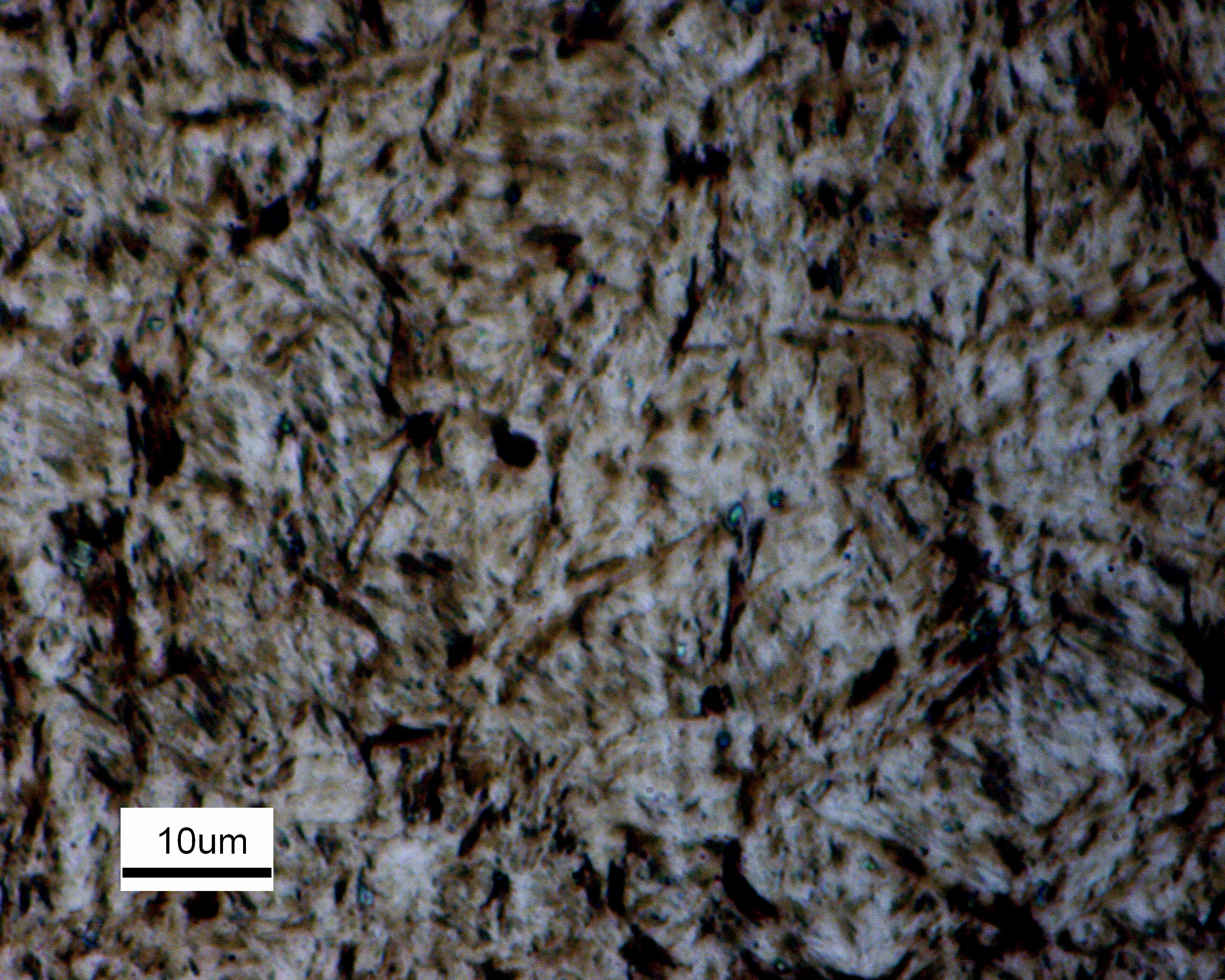
Martensite in AISI 4140 steel

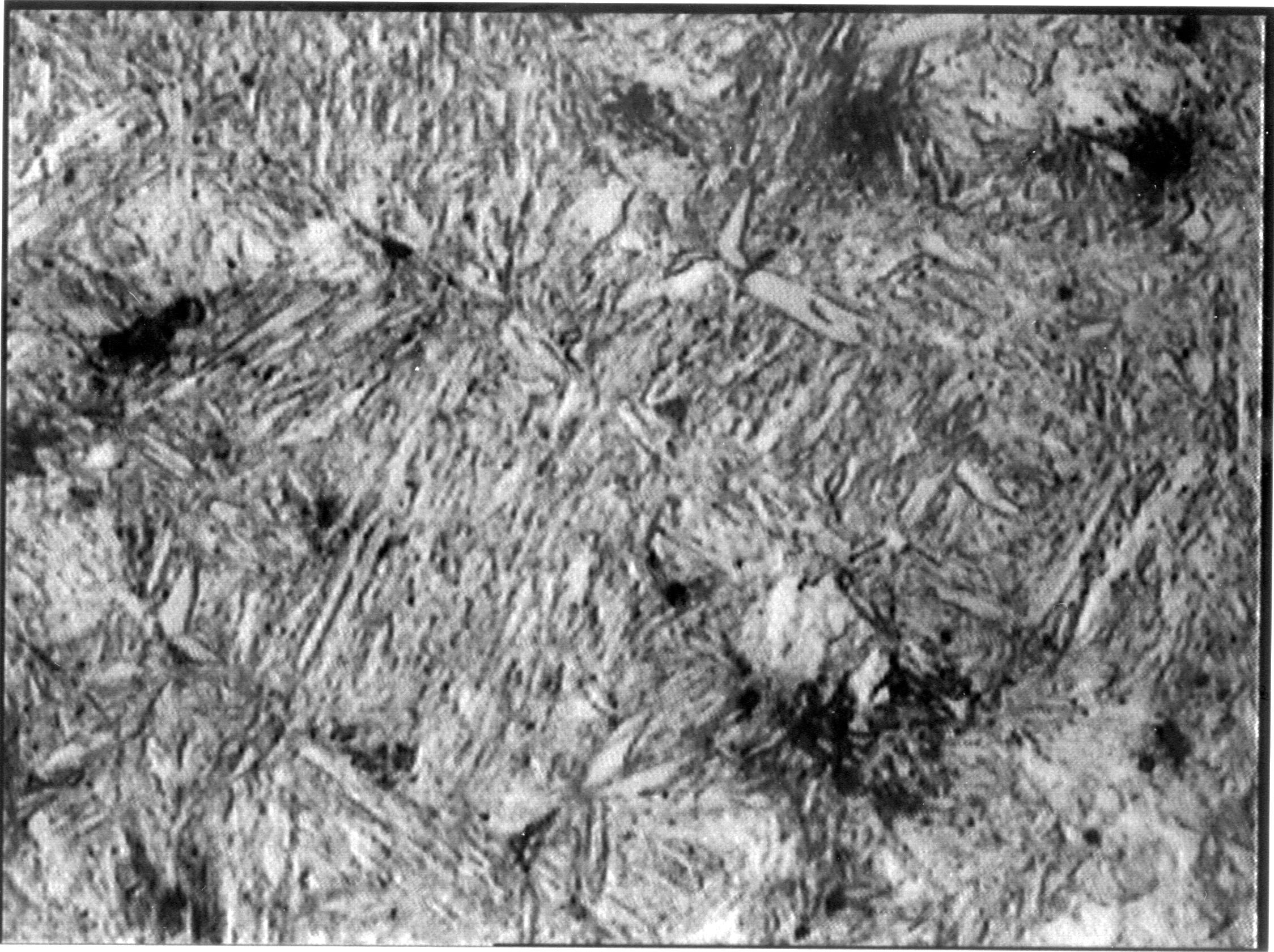
0.35% carbon steel, water-quenched from 870 °C

Martensite is a very hard form of steel crystalline structure. It is named after German metallurgist Adolf Martens. By analogy the term can also refer to any crystal structure that is formed by diffusionless transformation.

== Properties ==
Martensite is formed in carbon steels by the rapid cooling (quenching) of the austenite form of iron at such a high rate that carbon atoms do not have time to diffuse out of the crystal structure in large enough quantities to form cementite (Fe_{3}C). Austenite is gamma-phase iron (γ-Fe), a solid solution of iron and alloying elements. As a result of the quenching, the face-centered cubic austenite transforms to a highly strained body-centered tetragonal form called martensite that is supersaturated with carbon. The shear deformations that result produce a large number of dislocations, which is a primary strengthening mechanism of steels. The highest hardness of a pearlitic steel is 400 Brinell, whereas martensite can achieve 700 Brinell.

The martensitic reaction begins during cooling when the austenite reaches the martensite start temperature (M_{s}), and the parent austenite becomes mechanically unstable. As the sample is quenched, an increasingly large percentage of the austenite transforms to martensite until the lower transformation temperature M_{f} is reached, at which time the transformation is completed.

For a eutectoid steel (0.76% C), between 6 and 10% of austenite, called retained austenite, will remain. The percentage of retained austenite increases from insignificant for less than 0.6% C steel, to 13% retained austenite at 0.95% C and 30–47% retained austenite for a 1.4% carbon steel. A very rapid quench is essential to create martensite. For a eutectoid carbon steel of thin section, if the quench starting at 750 °C and ending at 450 °C takes place in 0.7 seconds (a rate of 430 °C/s) no pearlite will form, and the steel will be martensitic with small amounts of retained austenite.

For steel with 0–0.6% carbon, the martensite has the appearance of lath and is called lath martensite. For steel with greater than 1% carbon, it will form a plate-like structure called plate martensite. Between those two percentages, the physical appearance of the grains is a mix of the two. The strength of the martensite is reduced as the amount of retained austenite grows. If the cooling rate is slower than the critical cooling rate, some amount of pearlite will form, starting at the grain boundaries where it will grow into the grains until the M_{s} temperature is reached, then the remaining austenite transforms into martensite at about half the speed of sound in steel.

In certain alloy steels, martensite can be formed by working the steel at M_{s} temperature by quenching to below M_{s} and then working by plastic deformations to reductions of cross section area between 20% and 40% of the original. The process produces dislocation densities up to 10^{13}/cm^{2}. The great number of dislocations, combined with precipitates that originate and pin the dislocations in place, produces a very hard steel. This property is frequently used in toughened ceramics like yttria-stabilized zirconia and in special steels like TRIP steels. Thus, martensite can be thermally induced or stress induced.

The growth of martensite phase requires very little thermal activation energy because the process is a diffusionless transformation, which results in the subtle but rapid rearrangement of atomic positions, and has been known to occur even at cryogenic temperatures. Martensite has a lower density than austenite, so that the martensitic transformation results in a relative change of volume. Of considerably greater importance than the volume change is the shear strain, which has a magnitude of about 0.26 and which determines the shape of the plates of martensite.

Martensite is not shown in the equilibrium phase diagram of the iron-carbon system because it is not an equilibrium phase. Equilibrium phases form by slow cooling rates that allow sufficient time for diffusion, whereas martensite is usually formed by very high cooling rates. Since chemical processes (the attainment of equilibrium) accelerate at higher temperature, martensite is easily destroyed by the application of heat. This process is called tempering. In some alloys, the effect is reduced by adding elements such as tungsten that interfere with cementite nucleation, but more often than not, the nucleation is allowed to proceed to relieve stresses. Since quenching can be difficult to control, many steels are quenched to produce an overabundance of martensite, then tempered to gradually reduce its concentration until the preferred structure for the intended application is achieved. The needle-like microstructure of martensite leads to brittle behavior of the material. Too much martensite leaves steel brittle; too little leaves it soft.

A strain-induced martensitic transformation commonly takes place from face-centered cubic (FCC) austenite to body-centered cubic (BCC) or body-centered tetragonal (BCT) structures in steels. However, a unique martensitic transformation from a disordered BCC parent phase to an FCC product phase was also observed in steels and high-entropy alloys.

== See also ==
- Eutectic
- Eutectoid
- Ferrite (iron)
- Maraging steel
- Spring steel
- Tool steel
