= Section beam =

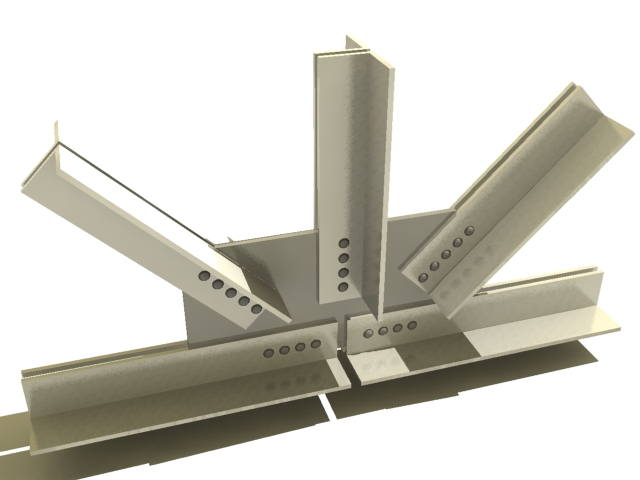

Section Beams are made of steel and they have a specific lengths and shapes like Ɪ-beam, 'L', C-channel and I flanged beam. These types of section are usually used in steel structures and it is common to connect them with plates of steel.

== Joints ==
There are three connection types:

- Rivets
- Bolts
- Welding

Rivets are the strongest and most common type.

== Safety ==
There are some calculation methods to determine whether the design and construction of the truss is safe.
