= Cellular beam =

Steal beam with circular holes

Cellular beam is a further development of the traditional castellated beam. The advantage of the steel beam castellation process is that it increases strength without adding weight, making both versions an inexpensive solution to achieve maximum structural load capacity in building construction.

The difference between cellular beam and castellated beam is the visual characteristic. A cellular beam has round openings (circular pattern) while the castellated beam has hexagonal openings (hexagonal pattern), both of which are achieved by a cutting and welding process. Cellular beams are usually made of structural steel, but can also be made of other materials. The cellular beam is a structural element that mainly withstands structural load laterally applied to the axis of the beam, and influences the overall performance of steel framed buildings. The type of deflection is mainly done by bending.

== Introduction ==
In 1987, Westok Structural Services Ltd of Wakefield invented and patented the structural steel cellular beam.

In 2009, the Steel Construction Institute developed software to assist engineers evaluating the dynamic behaviour of composite floors supported by cellular beams.

Since 1940, civil engineers have endeavoured to find solutions to reduce the cost and weight of steel frame construction. Due to the restrictions with regard to the maximum permissible deflections, the high-strength properties of structural steel cannot always be optimally used. As a result, several new steel mixtures have been identified to increase the stiffness of steel components without significantly increasing the required steel weight. The use of steel girders with web openings (SBWOs) for structures such as industrial buildings has proven to be extensive. Civil engineers came up with a solution to use a composite design of ultra-shallow floor joists together with concrete used on the Douala Grand Mall in Cameroon. Since the 2010s, further investigations into steel construction and fire protection have been carried out, which led to innovations in the field of passive fire protection that could save lives and assets.

== See also ==
- Castellated beam
- Open web steel joist
- Steel design
- Weld access hole
