= Konstantinos Tsavdaridis =

Professor at the University of Leeds

Konstantinos Daniel Tsavdaridis
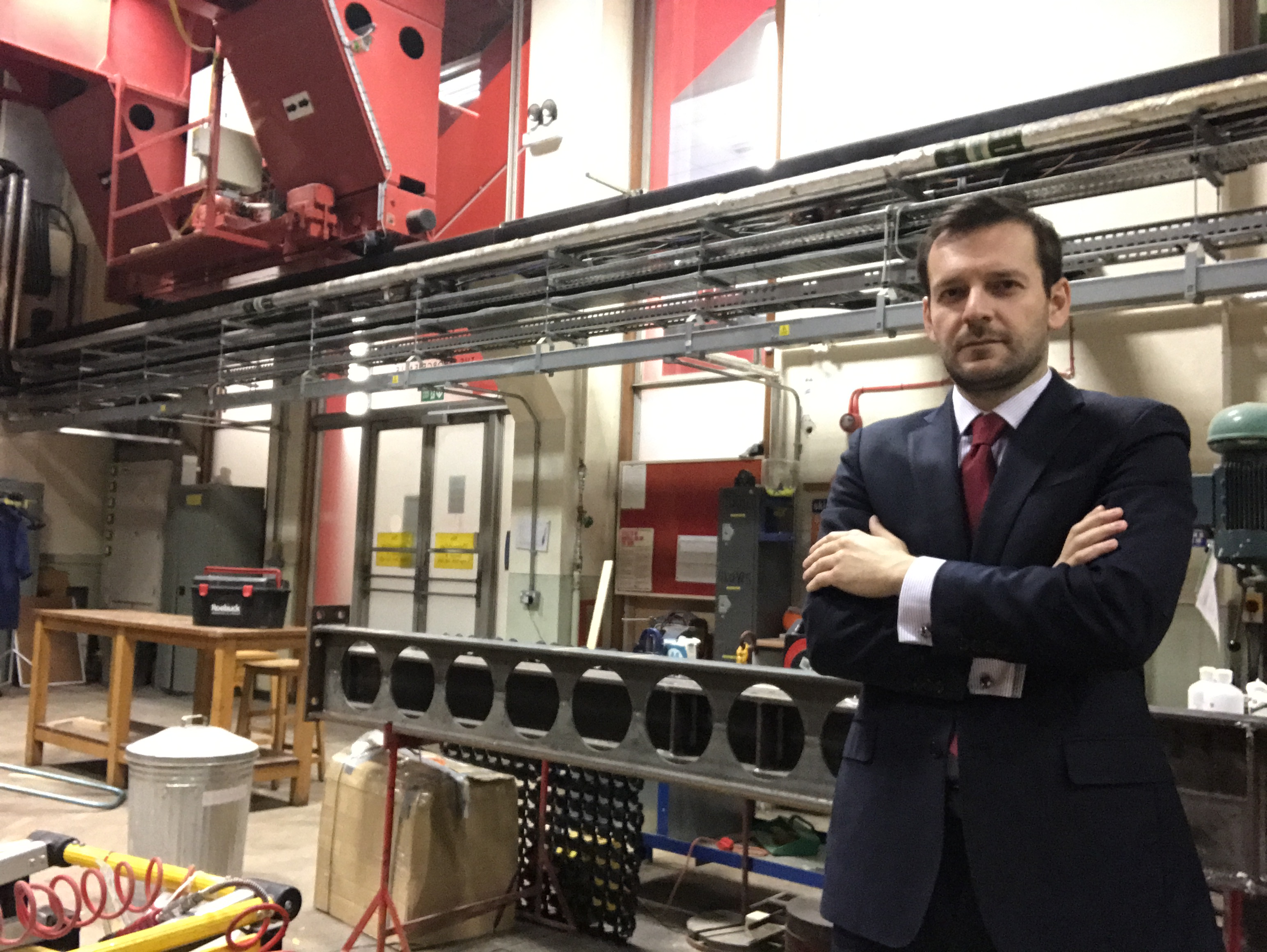
- Born: 30 June 1983 (age 43); Thessaloniki, Greece
- Education: City, University of London; Imperial College London
- Scientific career
- Workplaces: University of Leeds

Konstantinos Daniel Tsavdaridis (Greek: Κωνσταντίνος Δανιήλ Τσαβδαρίδης; Born in Thessaloniki, Greece) is a professor at the School of Civil Engineering of the University of Leeds, known for his work on lightweight steel and steel-concrete composite structures and particularly for the design of novel perforated beams and tall buildings.

== Education ==
Tsavdaridis received his degree in civil engineering from City, University of London in 2005. He continued his studies at Imperial College London, where in 2006 he received a MSc and a DIC in general structural engineering. In 2010 he completed his PhD in structural engineering at City, University of London under the supervision of Professor Cedric D'Mello.

== Career and research ==
After completing his PhD, he spent two years at City as lecturer in structural engineering and in 2012 moved to the University of Leeds as assistant professor. Tsavdaridis' research is focused on the development and the application of novel designs for structural forms of beams, connections and flooring systems. He has majorly contributed in understanding the behaviour of lightweight structural forms under normal and seismic loads and other systems in the area of structural engineering and built environment. His major contribution is that of the design of long-span steel perforated (cellular and castellated beam) I-beams with standard and nonstandard web opening shapes while focusing on the buckling of thin-shell members

== Awards and honours ==
Tsavdaridis was promoted to associate professor at the age of 32, and soon after he was awarded as the youngest Fellow from the Institution of Civil Engineers (FICE) in the UK. In 2019, he won a Senior Fellowship from the Royal Academy of Engineering in the UK for his work on pioneering metallic connections for modular construction.

== Selected publications ==
- Tsavdaridis KD; D Mello C; Huo BY (2009) Shear capacity of perforated concrete-steel ultra shallow floor beams (USFB) 6th National Concrete Conference, TEE, ETEK, pp. 159–159
- Tsavdaridis KD; D Mello C (2011) FE modelling techniques for web-post buckling response: Perforated steel beams with closely spaced web openings of various shapes 6th European Conference on Steel and Composite, Structures, pp. 1851–1856
- Tsavdaridis KD; Cedric D (2011) Web buckling study of the behaviour and strength of perforated steel beams with different novel web opening shapes. Journal of Constructional Steel Research, 67 (10), pp. 1605–1620.
- Tsavdaridis KD; D'Mello C (2012) Vierendeel Bending Study of Perforated Steel Beams with Various Novel Web Opening Shapes, through Non-linear Finite Element Analyses. Journal of Structural Engineering, 138 (10), pp. 1214–1230
- Tsavdaridis KD; Faghih F; Nikitas N (2014) Assessment of perforated steel beam-to-column connections subjected to cyclic loading. Journal of Earthquake Engineering, 18 (8), pp. 1302–1325.
- Tsavdaridis KD; Pilbin C (2014) Finite element modelling of steel connections with web openings: aseismic design and progressive collapse The 7th European Conference on Steel and Composite Structures.
- Tsavdaridis KD; Papadopoulos T (2015) Assessment of beam-column connections using perforated beams with multiple closely spaced web openings 8th International Conference on Behaviour of Steel Structural in Seismic Areas.
- Tsavdaridis KD; Galiatsatos G (2015) Assessment of cellular beams with transverse stiffeners and closely spaced web openings. Thin-Walled Structures, 94, pp. 636–650
- Maraveas C; Balokas GA; Tsavdaridis KD (2015) Numerical evaluation on shell buckling of empty thin-walled steel tanks under wind load according to current American and European design codes. Thin-Walled Structures, 95, pp. 152–160
- Tsavdaridis KD (2015) Seismic Resistant Design of Connections with the Use of Perforated Beams Journal of Civil and Environmental Engineering, Iuorio O; Homma EE; Tsavdaridis KD The application of free-form grid shells as protective shelters in archaeological sites Proceedings of the IASS Annual Symposium 2016
- Tsavdaridis KD; Papadopoulos T (2016) A FE parametric study of RWS beam-to-column bolted connections with cellular beams. Journal of Constructional Steel Research, 116, pp. 92–113
- Maraveas C; Fasoulakis Z; Tsavdaridis KD (2017) Post-Fire Assessment and Reinstatement of Steel Structures. Journal of Structural Fire Engineering, 8 (2).
- Maraveas C; Tsavdaridis KD; Nadjai A (2017) Fire Resistance of Unprotected Ultra Shallow Floor Beams, (USFB): A Numerical Investigation. Fire Technology, 53 (2), pp. 609–627.
