= Arthur Vierendeel =

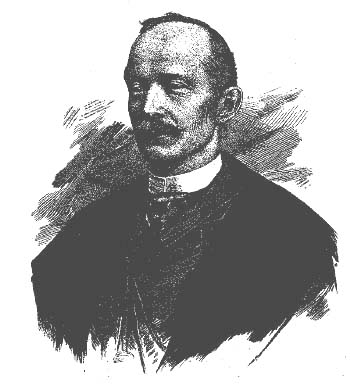
- Born: 10 April 1852; Leuven, Belgium
- Died: 8 November 1940 (aged 88)

Arthur Vierendeel (10 April 1852 – 8 November 1940) was a civil engineer born in Leuven, Belgium. He had a career as a university professor, and civil engineer. The structure known as the Vierendeel truss is named after him.

== Biography ==
He obtained an MSc in construction and mining engineering in 1874 at the Université catholique de Louvain, after which he worked as an engineer for the company Nicaise et Delcuve in La Louvière, Belgium. In 1885 he became Director for the Ministry of Public Works in West Flanders, and four years afterward also achieved the post of Professor of Construction, Material Strength, and Structural Engineering at the Université catholique de Louvain.

The idea of a bridge without trusses came to him in 1895; the design later became known as a Vierendeel bridge. For the 1897 World Fair at Brussels he built a 31.5m span bridge at his own expense and loaded to show the correlation between measurement and his numerical analysis.

His work, Cours de stabilité des constructions (1889) was an important reference during more than half a century. His first bridge was built in Avelgem in 1902, crossing the Scheldt river. The construction of this bridge became famous through the Stijn Streuvels book De Teloorgang van de Waterhoek.

He retired as director of public works in West Flanders in 1927, and as Professor at Leuven Catholic University in 1936. He died in 1940.

== Legacy ==
The Vierendeel truss was used in Belgium, particularly on the Belgian railways. Discussions in the journal Der Eisenbau concerning the pros and cons of the Vierendeel truss led to the development of deformational modelling of structures - necessary for mathematical analysis of Vierendeel trusses.

He emphasised an importance of aesthetics over pure engineering:

Pour les constructions métalliques les dimensions doivent être déterminées à priori par des considérations esthétiques et qu’après seulement il y a lieu de recourir à la formule mathématique. (When constructing in metal the dimensions must be determined a priori by aesthetic considerations and only afterwards should mathematical formulas be used)

— A. Vierendeel

As of 2011 the castellated beam and cellular beam are in common use in construction for roof and floor support - both are open web structures without diagonal trusses; vierendeel truss type analysis is used to understand and predict failure modes, which include vierendeel truss type failures.

== See also ==
- Vierendeel bridge
