= A514 =

A514 may refer to:

- A514 road (Great Britain)
- A514 steel
- Werra (A514), a 1993 Elbe class replenishment ship built in the Flensburger Schiffbau-Gesellschaft
