= USAF-96 =

US Air Force steel

USAF-96 is a high-strength, high-performance, low-alloy, low-cost steel, developed for new generation of bunker buster type bombs, e.g. the Massive Ordnance Penetrator and the improved version of the GBU-28 bomb known as EGBU-28. It was developed by the US Air Force at the Eglin Air Force Munitions Directorate. It uses only materials domestic to the USA. In particular it requires no tungsten.

The development of this steel was directed to find a low-cost replacement for strong and tough but expensive superalloy steels such as AF-1410, Aermet-100, HY-180, and HP9-4-20/30. A high-performance casing material is required so the weapon survives the high impact speeds required for deep penetration. The material has a wide range of other applications, from missile parts and tank bodies to machine parts.

An earlier material, Eglin steel, ES-1, resolved these issues but the tungsten used in it was expensive, difficult to melt, and the resulting tungsten carbide particles made the material difficult to process in thick sections. However, the tungsten also gave ES-1 excellent high-temperature strength.

These materials can be less expensive because they can be ladle-refined. They do not require vacuum processing. Unlike some other high-performance alloys, they can be welded easily, broadening the range of applications. Also, these formulas use roughly half as much nickel as other superalloys, substituting silicon to help with toughness and particles of vanadium carbide (and for ES-1, tungsten carbide) for additional hardness and high-temperature strength. The materials also use chromium, some molybdenum and low to medium amounts of carbon, which contribute to the materials' strength and hardness.

== Properties, USAF-96 ==
USAF-96 is a balance of cost, tensile strength, and toughness. By varying the heat treatment to include water or liquid nitrogen quenching, or omitting the normalization heat-treat to permit work hardening, properties can be improved.

With an economical water quench, the yield at room temperature (tensile strength before deformation) is 194,600 psi (1341.7 MPa), ultimate strength (breaking point) is 250,100 psi (1724.3 MPa). Rockwell hardness is 48.7. For toughness, the Charpy V-notch result is 29.0 ft.-lb (39.3 J) at -40F (-40 °C).

By comparison, ordinary A36 structural steel yields at 36,000 psi (250 MPa), and 4150 "ordnance" steel (used in high-quality military gun barrels) at 75,000 psi (520 MPa).

The material is not expected to be corrosion resistant. Also, a hydrogen bake-out might be required to assure high-quality welds.

== Details ==
USAF-96's composition by weight is:

- Carbon (0.24 to 0.32%) The upper limit prevents quench-cracking and defects.
- Chromium (2.00 to 3.00%), enhances strength and hardenability.
- Molybdenum (0.50 to 1.50%), enhances hardenability, and the upper limit prevents segregation and stabilization of bainite.
- Vanadium (0.05 to 0.35%), increases toughness, and prevents grain boundaries from growing at high temperatures.
- Manganese (1.00% or less) This optionally can increase strength and toughness, but it is not required. The upper limit prevents secondary phases that reduce strength.
- Nickel (3.00% or less), increases toughness at low temperatures (<-40C). However, it increases cost.
- Silicon (1.50% or less), stabilizes the austenite phase, enhances toughness. The upper limit prevents softening of the steel and stabilization of the bainite phase.
- Iron (balance of composition)

Permitted impurities:

- Copper (maximum of 0.20%)
- Phosphorus (max. 0.015%)
- Sulfur (max. 0.012%)
- Calcium (max. 0.02%), sulfur control agent
- Nitrogen (max. 0.15%)
- Aluminium (max. 0.025%)

USAF-96 has an unusually wide range of production methods for a superalloy: Ladle refined with vacuum treatment; vacuum induction melting; vacuum arc remelting, and even electro slag remelting. Vacuum treatments are recommended for best strength and premium uses.

The materials have to undergo heat treatment involving normalization, quenching and tempering to develop the required austenitic microstructure, with subsequent tempering.

Test plates (on example 1) were 1.5 inches, produced by a vacuum ladle. First they were normalized. They were charged in a furnace at 500F (260C). Heated at 300F (149C) per hour to 1875F (1024C). Held at 1850F for 30 minutes per inch of section size, and then water-quenched to below 125F (52C). Next the samples were tempered within 24 hours of quenching by heating them at 300F (149C) per hour and holding them for at least 60 minutes per inch at about 400F ((204C) or at least 3 hours, then cooled to room temperature.

== Credit ==
The patent application for USAF-96 credits (Dr.) Rachel Ann Abrahams as inventor. USAF-96 was inspired by Eglin steel; the inventor thinks of it as Eglin steel adjusted to work without tungsten.

U.S. Patent 10450621 was issued to Dr. Abrahams on October 22, 2019.

== See also ==
- Eglin steel
- Aermet (High performance steels.)
- Maraging steel (High performance precipitation-hardened steels, somewhat similar to USAF-96.)
- Eglin Air Force Base
