= A53 =

A53 may refer to:

- Old Indian Defence, Encyclopaedia of Chess Openings code
- A53 road (England)
- A53 steel, a carbon steel alloy
- ARM Cortex-A53, a microprocessor
- Samsung Galaxy A53 5G, an Android smartphone
