= ASTM A992 =

Grade of steel

ASTM A992 steel is a structural steel alloy often used in the US for steel wide-flange and I beams. Like other carbon steels, the density of ASTM A992 steel is approximately 7850 kg/m^{3} (0.2836 lb/in^{3}). ASTM A992 steel has the following minimum mechanical properties, according to ASTM specification A992/A992M. Tensile yield strength, 345 MPa (50 ksi); tensile ultimate strength, 450 MPa (65 ksi); strain to rupture (sometimes called elongation) in a 200-mm-long test specimen, 18%; strain to rupture in a 50-mm-long test specimen, 21%.

ASTM A992 is currently the most available steel type for structural wide-flange beams. The industry's technical institute describes the standard thus: "ASTM A992 (Fy = 50 ksi, Fu = 65 ksi) is the preferred material specification for wide-flange shapes, having replaced ASTM A36 and A572 grade 50. There are a couple of noteworthy enhancements with ASTM A992. Material ductility is well defined since a maximum yield-to-tensile strength ratio of 0.85 is specified. Additionally, weldability is improved since a maximum carbon equivalent value of 0.45 (0.47 for Group 4 and 5 shapes) is required. ASTM A992 is written to cover all hot-rolled shapes."

== See also ==
- Structural steel

== Further information ==
- Do you 992? - AISC Steel Solutions Center
