= Eglin steel =

High-performance steel for bombs

Eglin steel (ES-1) is a high-strength, high-performance, low-alloy, low-cost steel, developed for a new generation of bunker buster type bombs, e.g. the Massive Ordnance Penetrator and the improved version of the GBU-28 bomb known as EGBU-28. It was developed by the US Air Force and the Ellwood National Forge Company.

The Air Force sought a low-cost replacement for strong and tough but expensive superalloy steels such as AF-1410, Aermet-100, HY-180, and HP9-4-20/30. A high-performance casing material is required so the weapon survives the high impact speeds required for deep penetration. The material has a wide range of other applications, from missile parts and tank bodies to machine parts.

The material can be less expensive because it can be ladle-refined. It does not require vacuum processing. Unlike some other high-performance alloys, Eglin steel can be welded easily, broadening the range of its application. Also, it uses roughly half as much nickel as other superalloys, substituting silicon to help with toughness and particles of vanadium carbide and tungsten carbide for additional hardness and high-temperature strength. The material also involves chromium, tungsten, and low to medium amounts of carbon, which contribute to the material's strength and hardness.

== Properties ==
At room temperature, ES-1's yield (tensile strength before deformation) is 193,900 psi (1,337 MPa), and its ultimate strength (breaking point) is 246,700 psi (1,701 MPa). At 900 °F (482 °C), its yield is 191,400 psi (1,320 MPa), and its ultimate strength is 215,700 psi (1,487 MPa). Rockwell C hardness is 45.6 (448 HV_{10}). For toughness, the Charpy notch impact is 56.2 ft⋅lbf (76.2 J) at room temperature, and 42.7 ft⋅lbf (57.9 J) at −40 °F (−40 °C).

ES-1 is a balance of cost, tensile strength, high temperature tensile strength and toughness. By varying the heat treatment to include water or liquid nitrogen quenching, or omitting the normalization heat-treat to permit work hardening, properties can be improved. ES-5, with an economical air and water quench, provides 244,800 psi (1,688 MPa) of high-rate yield strength, and 291,900 psi (2,013 MPa) high-rate ultimate strength. Low-rate yield strength is 216,000 psi (1,490 MPa), and low-rate ultimate strength is 270,200 psi (1,863 MPa).

By comparison, ordinary structural steel has a yield strength of 36,000 psi (250 MPa), and 4150 "ordnance" steel (used in high-quality military gun barrels) has a yield strength of 75,000 psi (520 MPa).

== Details ==
The material composition by weight is:

- Iron (84.463–90%)
- Carbon (0.16–0.35%)
- Manganese (0.85%)
- Silicon (max. 1.25%), stabilizes the austenite phase, enhances toughness
- Chromium (max. 1.50–3.25%), increases strength and hardenability
- Molybdenum (max. 0.55%), increases hardenability
- Nickel (5.00%), increases toughness
- Tungsten (0.70–3.25%), increases strength and wear resistance
- Vanadium (0.05–0.3%), increases toughness
- Copper (0.50%)
- Phosphorus (impurity, max. 0.015%)
- Sulfur (impurity, max. 0.012%)
- Calcium (max. 0.02%), sulfur control agent
- Nitrogen (impurity, max. 0.14%)
- Aluminium (max. 0.05%)

The material has an unusually wide range of production methods for a superalloy: electric arc, ladle refined with vacuum treatment; vacuum induction melting; vacuum arc remelting, and even electro slag remelting. Vacuum treatments are recommended for best strength and premium uses.

The material has to undergo heat treatment involving normalization, quenching and tempering to develop the required austenitic microstructure, with subsequent tempering. Test plates were 1 inch (2.5 cm). First they were normalized. They were charged in a furnace at 500 °F (260 °C), heated at 125 °F (69 °C) per hour to 1,625–1,725 °F (885–941 °C), held at 1,750 °F (950 °C) for an hour per inch of section size, and then air-cooled to room temperature. Next the samples were austenized by repeating the process up to 1,700 °F (930 °C), and held for an hour per inch of section size, then oil quenched to below 125 °F (52 °C). Finally, they were tempered in an oven that started below 500 °F (260 °C), increased at 100 °F (56 °C) per hour per inch of section size, and allowed to air-cool to room temperature.

== Credit ==
The patent credits Morris Dilmore and James Ruhlman as inventors.

== See also ==
- USAF-96 – A later material developed for the same purposes, also at Eglin.
- Aermet – Type of martensitic alloy steel
- Maraging steel – Steel known for strength and toughness
- Eglin Air Force Base – United States Air Force operating base in northwestern Florida
