= Maraging steel =

Steel known for strength and toughness

Maraging steels (a portmanteau of "martensitic" and "aging") are steels that possess superior strength and toughness without losing ductility. Aging refers to age-hardening, the extended heat-treatment process. These steels are a special class of very-low-carbon ultra-high-strength steels that derive their strength from precipitation of intermetallic compounds rather than from carbon. The principal alloying metal is 15 to 25 wt% nickel. Secondary alloying metals, which include cobalt, molybdenum and titanium, are added to produce intermetallic precipitates.

The first maraging steel was developed by Clarence Gieger Bieber at Inco in the late 1950s. It produced 20 and 25 wt% Ni steels with small additions of aluminium, titanium, and niobium. The intent was to induce age-hardening with the aforementioned intermetallics in an iron-nickel martensitic matrix, and it was discovered that Co and Mo complement each other very well. Commercial production started in December 1960. A rise in the price of Co in the late 1970s led to cobalt-free maraging steels.

The common, non-stainless grades contain 17–19 wt% Ni, 8–12 wt% Co, 3–5 wt% Mo and 0.2–1.6 wt% Ti. Addition of chromium produces corrosion-resistant stainless grades. This also indirectly increases hardenability as they require less Ni; high-Cr, high-Ni steels are generally austenitic and unable to become martensite when heat treated, while lower-Ni steels can.

Alternative variants of Ni-reduced maraging steels are based on alloys of Fe and Mn plus minor additions of Al, Ni and Ti with compositions between Fe-9wt% Mn to Fe-15wt% Mn qualify used. The manganese has an effect similar to nickel, i.e. it stabilizes the austenite phase. Hence, depending on their manganese content, Fe-Mn maraging steels can be fully martensitic after quenching them from the high temperature austenite phase or they can contain retained austenite. The latter effect enables the design of maraging-transformation-induced-plasticity (TRIP) steels.

== Properties ==
Due to the low carbon content (less than 0.03%) maraging steels have good machinability. Prior to aging, they may also be cold rolled to as much as 90% without cracking. Maraging steels offer good weldability, but must be aged afterward to restore the original properties to the heat affected zone.

When heat-treated the alloy has very little dimensional change, so it is often machined to its final dimensions. Due to the high alloy content maraging steels have a high hardenability. Since ductile Fe-Ni martensites are formed upon cooling, cracks are non-existent or negligible. The steels can be nitrided to increase case hardness and polished to a fine surface finish.

Non-stainless varieties of maraging steel are moderately corrosion-resistant and resist stress corrosion and hydrogen embrittlement. Corrosion-resistance can be increased by cadmium plating or phosphating.

== Grades of maraging steel ==
Maraging steels are usually described by a number (e.g., SAE steel grades 200, 250, 300 or 350), which indicates the approximate nominal tensile strength in thousands of pounds per square inch (ksi). The compositions and required properties were defined in US military standard MIL-S-46850D. The higher grades have more cobalt and titanium in the alloy; the compositions below are taken from table 1 of MIL-S-46850D. As of July 1, 2024, that standard was cancelled by the U.S. Military and replaced with a number of SAE AMS specifications, which now govern each grade in a separate specification, as enumerated below.

Maraging steel compositions, by grade
| Element | Grade 200 | Grade 250 | Grade 300 | Grade 350 |
|---|---|---|---|---|
| Iron | balance | balance | balance | balance |
| Nickel | 17.0–19.0 | 17.0–19.0 | 18.0–19.0 | 18.0–19.0 |
| Cobalt | 8.0–9.0 | 7.0–8.5 | 8.5–9.5 | 11.5–12.5 |
| Molybdenum | 3.0–3.5 | 4.6–5.2 | 4.6–5.2 | 4.6–5.2 |
| Titanium | 0.15–0.25 | 0.3–0.5 | 0.5–0.8 | 1.3–1.6 |
| Aluminium | 0.05–0.15 | 0.05–0.15 | 0.05–0.15 | 0.05–0.15 |
| Tensile strength, MPa (ksi) | 1,379 (200) | 1,724 (250) | 2,068 (300) | 2,413 (350) |
| SAE AMS Specification | AMS6511C | AMS6512J | AMS6514K | AMS6515C |

This family is known as the 18Ni maraging steels, from its nickel percentage. There is also a family of cobalt-free maraging steels which are cheaper but not quite as strong; one example is Fe-18.9Ni-4.1Mo-1.9Ti. There has been Russian and Japanese research in Fe-Ni-Mn maraging alloys.

== Heat treatment cycle ==
The steel is first annealed at approximately 820 °C (1,510 °F) for 15–30 minutes for thin sections and for 1 hour per 25 mm (1 in) thickness for heavy sections, to ensure formation of a fully austenitized structure. This is followed by air cooling or quenching to room temperature to form a soft, heavily dislocated iron-nickel lath (untwinned) martensite. Subsequent aging (precipitation hardening) of the more common alloys for approximately 3 hours at a temperature of 480 to 500 °C (900 to 930 °F) produces a fine dispersion of Ni_{3}(X,Y) intermetallic phases along dislocations left by martensitic transformation, where X and Y are solute elements added for such precipitation. Overaging leads to a reduction in stability of the primary, metastable, coherent precipitates, leading to their dissolution and replacement with semi-coherent Laves phases such as Fe_{2}Ni/Fe_{2}Mo. Further excessive heat-treatment brings about the decomposition of the martensite and reversion to austenite.

Newer compositions of maraging steels have revealed other intermetallic stoichiometries and crystallographic relationships with the parent martensite, including rhombohedral and massive complex Ni_{50}(X,Y,Z)_{50} (Ni_{50}M_{50} in simplified notation).

== Processing of maraging steel ==
The maraging steels are a popular class of structural materials because of their superior mechanical properties among different categories of steel. Their mechanical properties can be tailored for different applications using various processing techniques. Some of the most widely used processing techniques for manufacturing and tuning of mechanical behavior of maraging steels are listed as follows:

- Solution treatment: As described in the section of Heat treatment cycle, the maraging steel is heated to a specific temperature range, after which it is quenched rapidly. In this step the alloying elements are dissolved, and a homogeneous microstructure is achieved. Homogeneous microstructure thus achieved improves the overall mechanical behavior of maraging steels such as fracture toughness and fatigue resistance.
- Aging of maraging steels: It is an important processing step as this step leads to precipitation of intermetallic compounds such Ni_{3}Al, Ni_{3}Mo, Ni_{3}Ti, etc. The semicoherent precipitates obtained during normal aging and incoherent precipitates obtained after overaging contribute to improvement of mechanical behavior by activating various strengthening mechanisms related to hindering of dislocation motion by precipitates. Strengthening mechanisms such as precipitate hardening where precipitates hinder dislocation motion via Orowan mechanism or dislocation bowing lead to increase in the ultimate tensile strength of maraging steels. Aging is also beneficial for reducing the microstructural heterogeneities which may occur due to non-uniform thermal distribution along the building direction in arc additive manufactured samples.
- Laser Powder Bed Fusion (LPBF): Laser Powder Bed Fusion is an additive manufacturing technique used to create components of intricate geometries using a powder metal which is fused together layer by layer using localized high power-density heat source such as a laser. The materials can be tailored to have specific mechanical properties by optimizing the process parameters associated with LPBF. It has been observed that processing parameters such as laser scanning speed, power and the scanning space can have significant effects on the mechanical properties of 300 maraging steel such as tensile strength, microhardness, and impact toughness. Along with the processing parameters, the type of heat treatment subjected to LPBF steels also play an important role. It is observed that processing parameters which have a higher magnitude reduce the relative density of the sample due to rapid vaporization or creation of voids and pores. It is also observed that the microhardness and strength of the steel decreases after solution treatment due to austenite reversion and disappearance of cellular microstructure. On the other hand, aging treatment after solution treatment increases the microhardness and tensile strength of steel which is attributed to formation of precipitates such as Ni_{3}Mo, Ni_{3}Ti, Fe_{2}Mo. The impact toughness increases after solution treatment but decreases after aging treatment, which can be attributed to the underlying microstructure consisting of tiny precipitates acting as regions of stress concentrators for crack formation. Formation of nanoscale precipitates of intermetallic compounds after aging process lead to marked increase in yield and ultimate tensile strength but substantial reduction in ductility of the material. This change in macroscopic behavior of the material can be linked to the evolution of microstructure from dimple to quasi-cleavage fracture morphology. Aging followed by solution treatment of selective laser melted steels also reduces the amount of retained austenite in the martensitic matrix and lead to change in the grain orientation. Aging can reduce the plastic anisotropy to some extent, but directionality of properties is largely influenced by its fabrication history. A stainless variant, the precipitation-hardening maraging stainless steel sold commercially as Corrax (also designated CX), is likewise processable by laser powder bed fusion. Lattice structures built from this alloy have been shown to combine high specific strength with high energy absorption, making the material of interest for lightweight structural and corrosion-resistant applications.
- Severe plastic deformation: It leads to increase in dislocation density in the materials which in turn assists in the ease of formation of intermetallic precipitates due to availability of faster diffusion pathways through the dislocation cores. It has been observed that plastic deformation before aging leads to reduced peak aging time and increase in peak hardness. Precipitate morphology in severely plastically deformed steel changes and becomes plate-like when overaged which is attributed to higher dislocation density. This in turn leads to significant reduction in ductility and increase in strength of the material. Along with morphology, the orientation of precipitates also play an important role in micromechanism of deformation as they induce anisotropy to the mechanical properties.

The mechanical properties of laser powder bed fusion maraging steel 300 are governed by the powder feedstock quality, the process parameters, the laser scan strategy, the build orientation, and the post-process heat treatment, all of which influence the resulting microstructure, density, porosity and residual stress.

== Uses ==
Maraging steel's strength and malleability in the pre-aged stage allows it to be formed into thinner rocket and missile skins than other steels, reducing weight for a given strength. Maraging steels have very stable properties and, even after overaging due to excessive temperature, only soften slightly. These alloys retain their properties at mildly elevated operating temperatures and have maximum service temperatures of over 400 °C (750 °F). They are suitable for engine components, such as crankshafts and gears, and the firing pins of automatic weapons that cycle from hot to cool repeatedly while under substantial load. Their uniform expansion and easy machinability before aging make maraging steel useful in high-wear components of assembly lines and dies. Other ultra-high-strength steels, such as AerMet alloys, are not as machinable because of their carbide content.

In the sport of fencing, blades used in competitions run under the auspices of the Fédération Internationale d'Escrime are usually made with maraging steel. Maraging blades are superior for foil and épée because crack propagation in maraging steel is 10 times slower than in carbon steel, resulting in less frequent breaking of the blade and fewer injuries. (Note: However, the notion that maraging steel blades break flat is a fencing urban legend. Testing has shown that the blade-breakage patterns in carbon steel and maraging steel are identical due to the similarity in the loading mode during bending. Additionally, a crack is likely to start at the same point and propagate along the same path (although much more slowly), as crack propagation in fatigue is a plastic phenomenon rather than microstructural.) Stainless maraging steel is used in bicycle frames (e.g. Reynolds 953 introduced in 2013) and golf club heads. It is also used in surgical components and hypodermic syringes, but is not suitable for scalpel blades because the lack of carbon prevents it from holding a good cutting edge.

Maraging steel is used in oil and gas sector as downhole tools and components due to its high mechanical strength. The steel's resistance to hydrogen embrittlement is critical in downhole environments where exposure to hydrogen sulfide (H₂S) can lead to material degradation and failure.

American musical instrument string producer Ernie Ball has made a specialist type of electric guitar string out of maraging steel, claiming that this alloy provides more output and enhanced tonal response.

The production, import, and export of maraging steels by certain entities, such as the United States, is closely monitored by international authorities because it is particularly suited for use in gas centrifuges for uranium enrichment; lack of maraging steel significantly hampers the uranium-enrichment process. Older centrifuges used aluminum tubes, while modern ones use carbon fiber composite.

== Physical properties ==
- Density: 8.1 g/cm^{3} (0.29 lb/in^{3})
- Specific heat, mean for 0–100 °C (32–212 °F): 452 J/kg·K (0.108 Btu/lb·°F)
- Melting point: 1,413 °C (2,575 °F)
- Thermal conductivity: 25.5 W/m·K
- Mean coefficient of thermal expansion: 11.3×10^{−6} K^{−1} (20.3×10^{−6} °F^{−1})
- Yield tensile strength: typically 1,400–2,400 MPa (200–350 ksi)
- Ultimate tensile strength: typically 1.6–2.5 GPa (230–360 ksi). Grades exist up to 3.5 GPa (510 ksi)
- Elongation at break: up to 15%
- K_{IC} fracture toughness: up to 175 MPa·m^{1/2}
- Young's modulus: 210 GPa (30×10^{6} psi)
- Shear modulus: 77 GPa (11.2×10^{6} psi)
- Bulk modulus: 140 GPa (20×10^{6} psi)
- Hardness (aged): 50 HRC (grade 250); 54 HRC (grade 300); 58 HRC (grade 350)

== See also ==
- Aermet
- USAF-96 and Eglin steel (Inexpensive maraging steels with less nickel and other expensive materials.)
