= Structural steel =

Type of steel used in construction

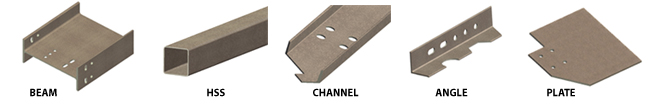
Structural steel

Structural steel is steel used for making construction materials in a variety of shapes. Many structural steel shapes take the form of an elongated beam having a profile of a specific cross section. Structural steel shapes, sizes, chemical composition, mechanical properties such as strengths, storage practices, etc., are regulated by standards in most industrialized countries. Structural steel is usually used in a system of interconnected members that are fixed together to carry loads in order to meet a specific need.

Structural steel shapes, such as I-beams, have high second moments of area, so can support a high load without excessive sagging.

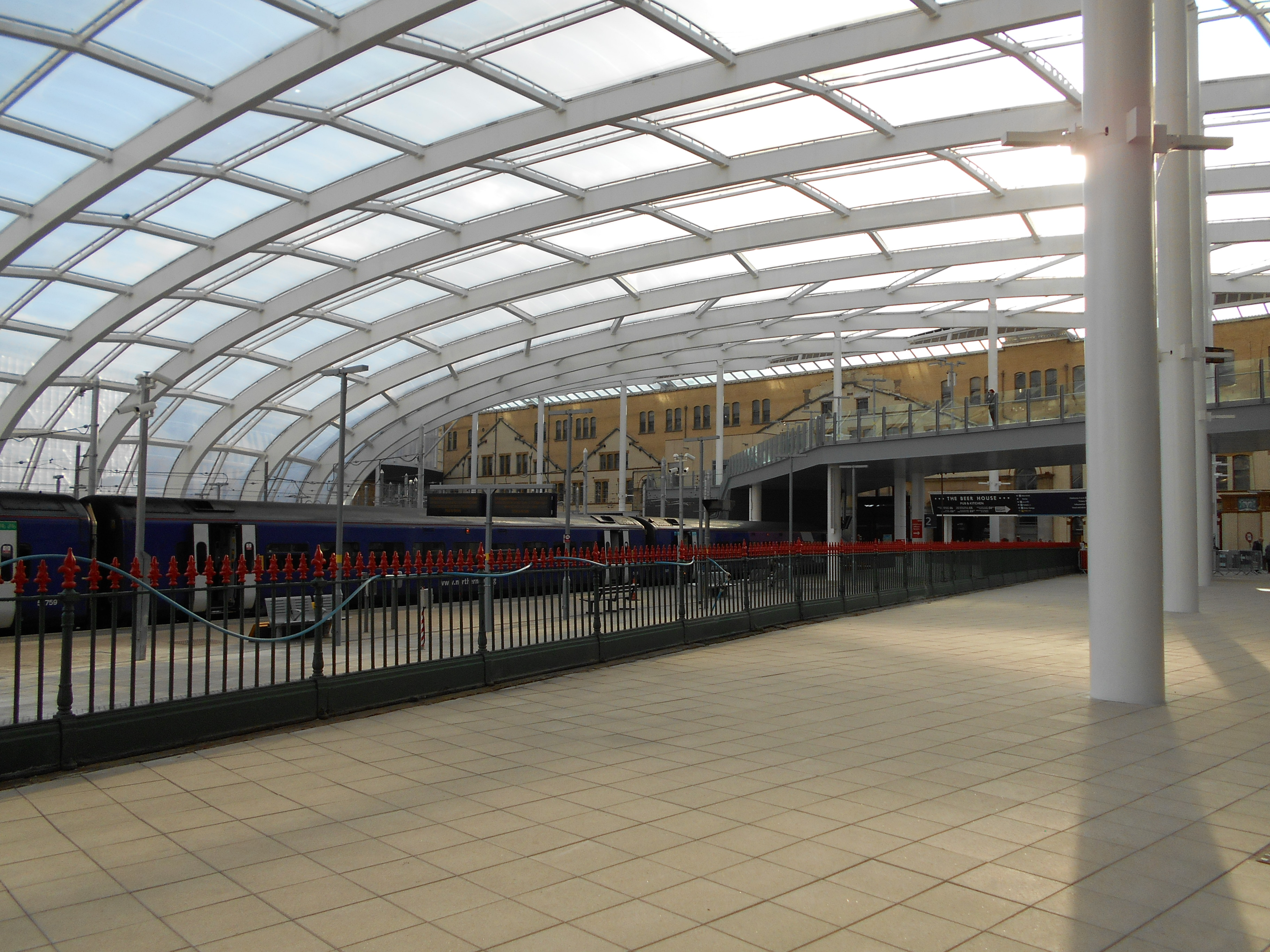
Structural steel roof at Manchester Victoria Station

== Structural shapes ==
The shapes available are described in published standards worldwide, and specialist, proprietary cross sections are also available.

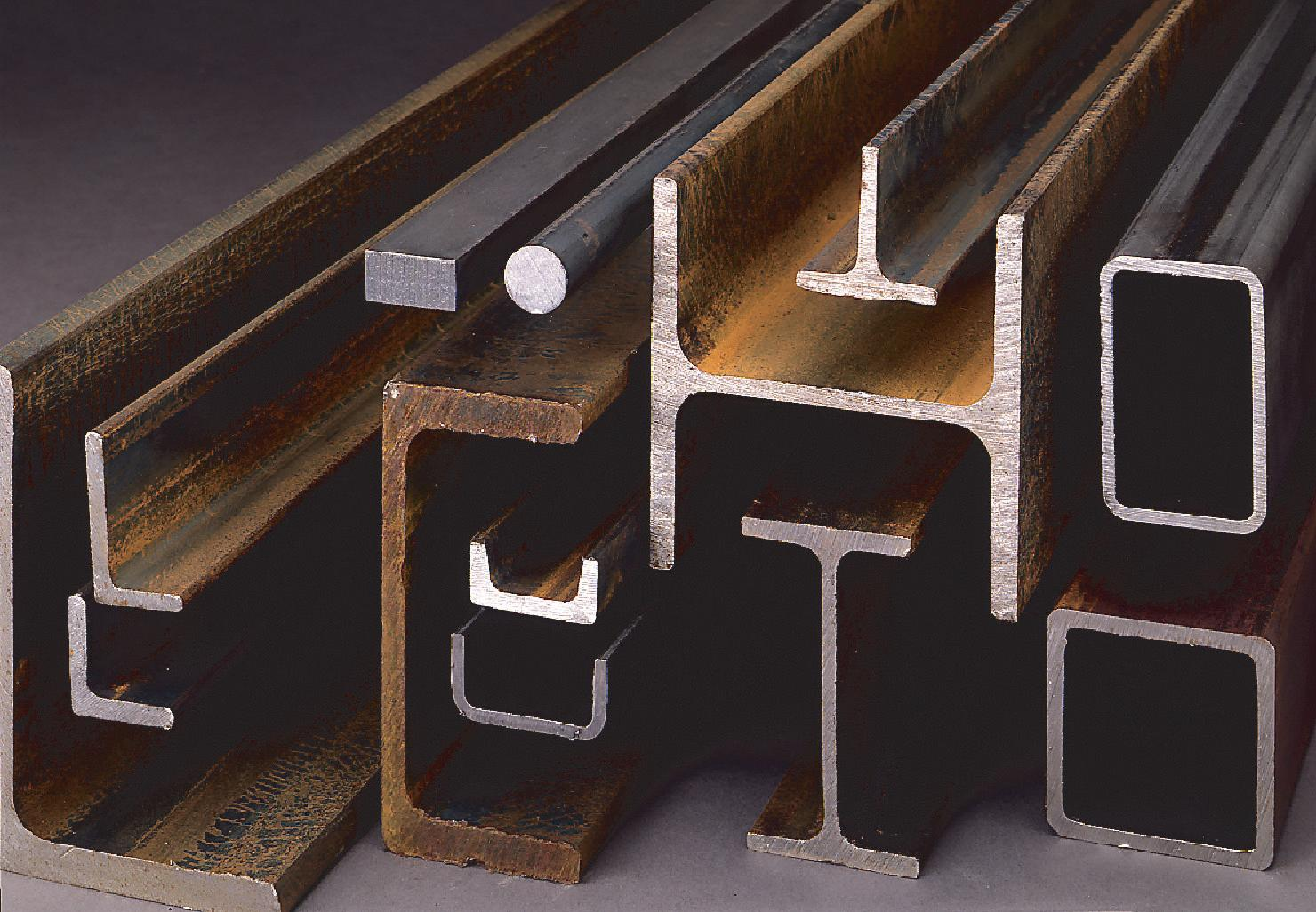
Seen here is an assortment of types of structural steel, with various cross sections, including angle iron (the L-shaped pieces), square bar, round bar, channel iron (the C-shaped pieces), I-beam and H-beam, T-bar, and square tube.

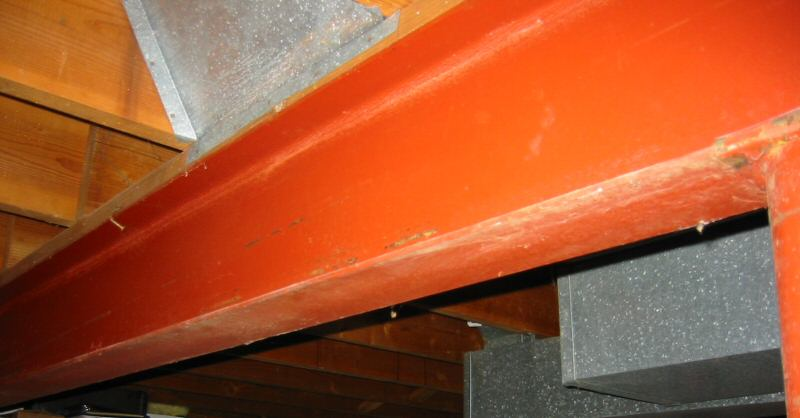
A steel I-beam used to support timber joists

- I-beam (serif capital 'I'-shaped cross-section – in Britain these include Universal Beams (UB) and Universal Columns (UC); in Europe it includes the IPE, HE, HL, HD and other sections; in the US it includes Wide Flange (WF or W-Shape) and H sections)
- Z-Shape (half a flange in opposite directions)
- HSS-Shape (Hollow structural section also known as SHS (structural hollow section) and including square, rectangular, circular (pipe) and elliptical cross sections)
- Angle (L-shaped cross-section)
- Structural channel, C-beam, or 'C' cross-section
- Tee (T-shaped cross-section)
- Bar, with a rectangular cross section, but not so wide so as to be called a sheet.
- Rod, a round or square section long compared to its width.
- Plate, metal sheets thicker than 6 mm or 1/4 in.
- Open web steel joist

Sections can be hot or cold rolled, or fabricated by welding together flat or bent plates.

The terms angle iron, channel iron, and sheet iron have been in common use since before wrought iron was replaced by steel for commercial purposes and are still often used. In technical writing angle stock, channel stock, and sheet are often used instead of those misnomers.

== Standards ==
=== Europe ===
Most steels used in Europe are specified to comply with EN 10025. However, some national standards remain in force. Example grades are S275J2 or S355K2W where S denotes structural steel; 275 or 355 denotes the yield strength in newtons per square millimetre or the equivalent megapascals; J2 or K2 denotes the material's toughness by Charpy impact test values, and the W denotes weathering steel. Further letters can be used to designate fine grain steel (N or NL); quenched and tempered steel (Q or QL); and thermomechanically rolled steel (M or ML).

Common yield strengths available are 195, 235, 275, 355, 420, and 460, although some grades are more commonly used than others. In the UK, almost all structural steel is S275 and S355. Higher grades such as 500, 550, 620, 690, 890 and 960 available in quenched and tempered material although grades above 690 receive little if any use in construction at present.

Euronorms define the shape of standard structural profiles:

- European I-beam: IPE – Euronorm 19-57
- European I-beam: IPN – DIN 1025-1
- European flange beams: HE – Euronorm 53-62
- European channels: UPN – DIN 1026-1
- European cold formed IS IS 800-1

=== US ===
Steels used for building construction in the US use standard alloys identified and specified by ASTM International. These steels have an alloy identification beginning with A and then two, three, or four numbers. The four-number AISI steel grades commonly used for mechanical engineering, machines, and vehicles are a completely different specification series.

The standard commonly used structural steels are:

==== Carbon steels ====
- A36 – structural shapes and plate.
- A53 – structural pipe and tubing.
- A500 – structural pipe and tubing.
- A501 – structural pipe and tubing.
- A529 – structural shapes and plate.
- A1085 – structural pipe and tubing.

==== High strength low alloy steels ====
- A441 – structural shapes and plates (Superseded by A572)
- A572 – structural shapes and plates.
- A618 – structural pipe and tubing.
- A992 – Possible applications are W or S I-Beams.
- A913 – Quenched and Self Tempered (QST) W shapes.
- A270 – structural shapes and plates.

==== Corrosion resistant high strength low alloy steels ====
- A243 – structural shapes and plates.
- A588 – structural shapes and plates.

==== Quenched and tempered alloy steels ====
- A514 – structural shapes and plates.
- A517 – boilers and pressure vessels.
- Eglin steel – Inexpensive aerospace and weaponry items.

==== Forged steel ====
- A668 – Steel Forgings

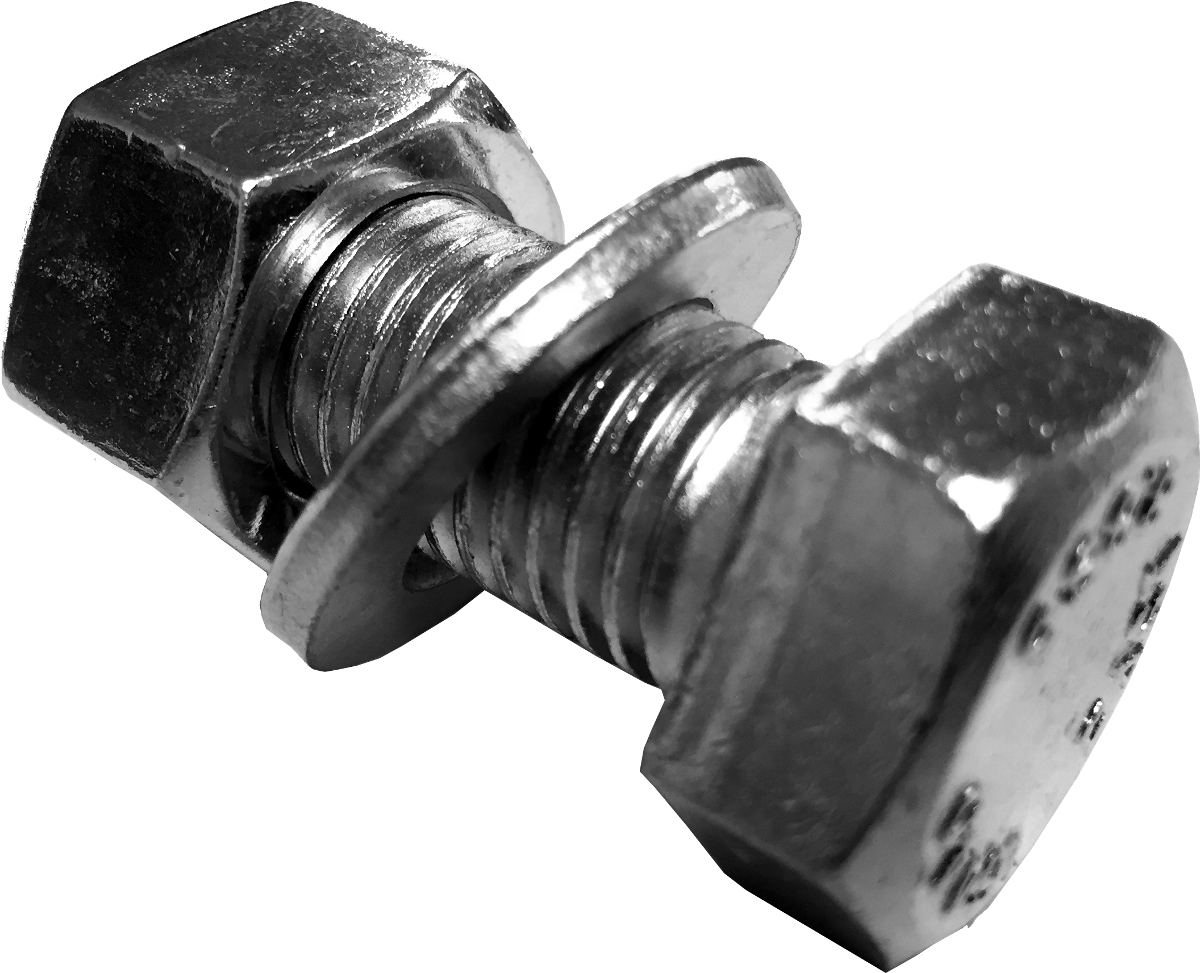
Non-preload bolt assembly (EN 15048)

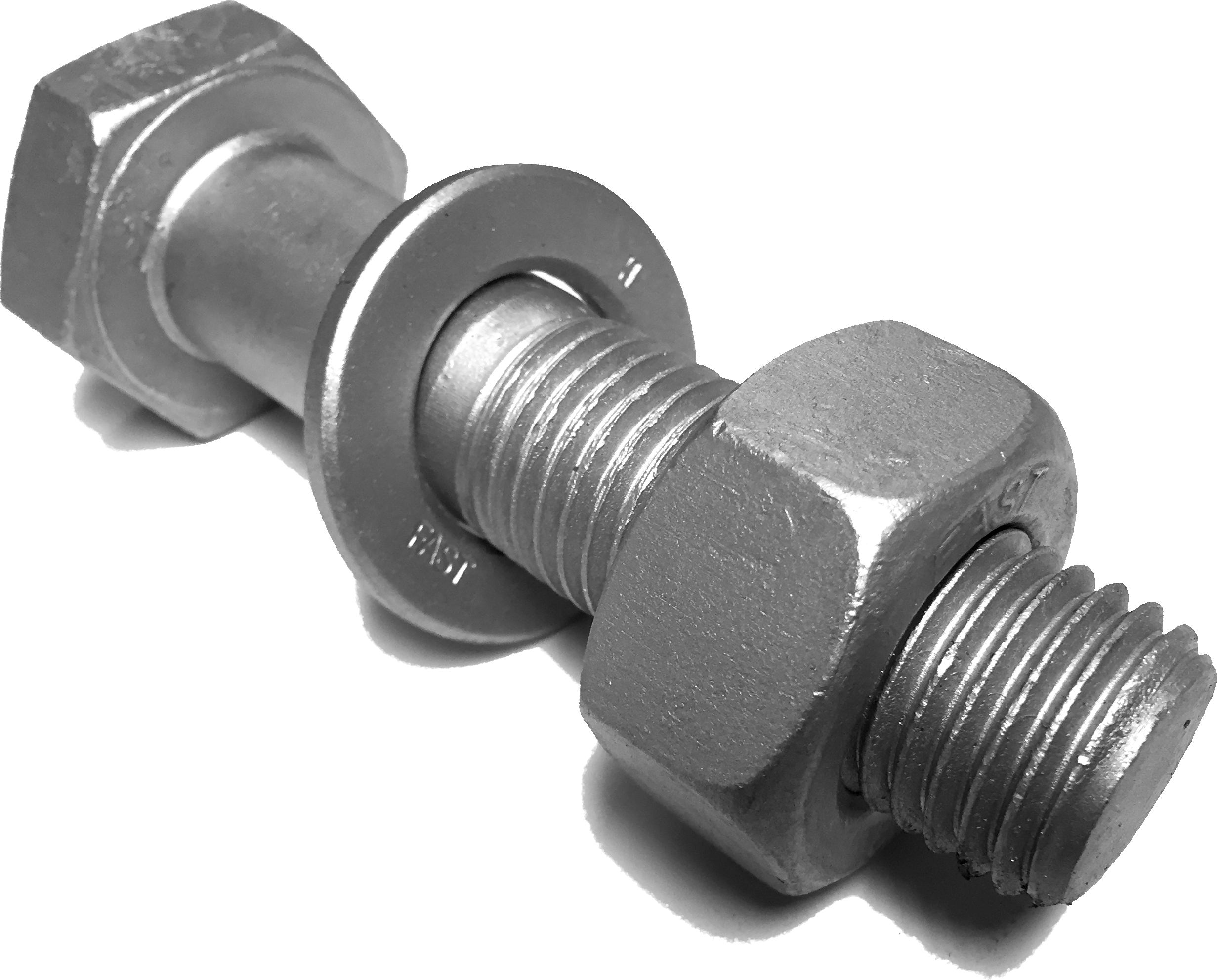
Pre-load bolt assembly (EN 14399)

=== CE marking ===
The concept of CE marking for all construction products and steel products is introduced by the Construction Products Directive (CPD). The CPD is a European Directive that ensures the free movement of all construction products within the European Union.

Because steel components are "safety critical", CE Marking is not allowed unless the Factory Production Control (FPC) system under which they are produced has been assessed by a suitable certification body that has been approved to the European Commission.

In the case of steel products such as sections, bolts and fabricated steelwork the CE Marking demonstrates that the product complies with the relevant harmonized standard.

For steel structures the main harmonized standards are:

- Steel sections and plate – EN 10025-1
- Hollow sections – EN 10219-1 and EN 10210-1
- Pre-loadable bolts – EN 14399-1
- Non-preloadable bolts – EN 15048-1
- Fabricated steel – EN 1090 −1

The standard that covers CE Marking of structural steelwork is EN 1090-1. The standard has come into force in late 2010. After a transition period of two years, CE Marking will become mandatory in most European Countries sometime early in 2012. The official end date of the transition period is July 1, 2014

== Design considerations ==
Steel is sold by weight so the design must be as light as possible whilst being structurally safe. Utilizing multiple, identical steel members can be cheaper than unique components.

Reinforced concrete and structural steel can be sustainable if used properly. Over 80% of structural steel members are fabricated from recycled metals, called A992 steel. This member material is cheaper and has a higher strength to weight ratio than previously used steel members (A36 grade).

Special considerations must be taken into account with structural steel to ensure it is not under a dangerous fire hazard condition.

Structural steel cannot be exposed to the environment without suitable protection, because any moisture, or contact with water, will cause oxidisation to occur, compromising the structural integrity of the building and endangering occupants and neighbors.

Having high strength, stiffness, toughness, and ductile properties, structural steel is one of the most commonly used materials in commercial and industrial building construction.

Structural steel can be developed into nearly any shape, which are either bolted or welded together in construction. Structural steel can be erected as soon as the materials are delivered on site, whereas concrete must be cured at least 1–2 weeks after pouring before construction can continue, making steel a schedule-friendly construction material.

Steel is inherently a noncombustible material. However, when heated to temperatures seen in a fire, the strength and stiffness of the material is significantly reduced. The International Building Code requires steel be enveloped in sufficient fire-resistant materials, increasing overall cost of steel structure buildings.

Steel, when in contact with water, can corrode, creating a potentially dangerous structure. Measures must be taken in structural steel construction to prevent any lifetime corrosion. The steel can be painted, providing water resistance. Also, the fire resistance material used to envelope steel is commonly water resistant.

Steel provides a less suitable surface environment for mold to grow than wood.

Tall structures are constructed using structural steel due to its constructability, as well as its high strength-to-weight ratio.

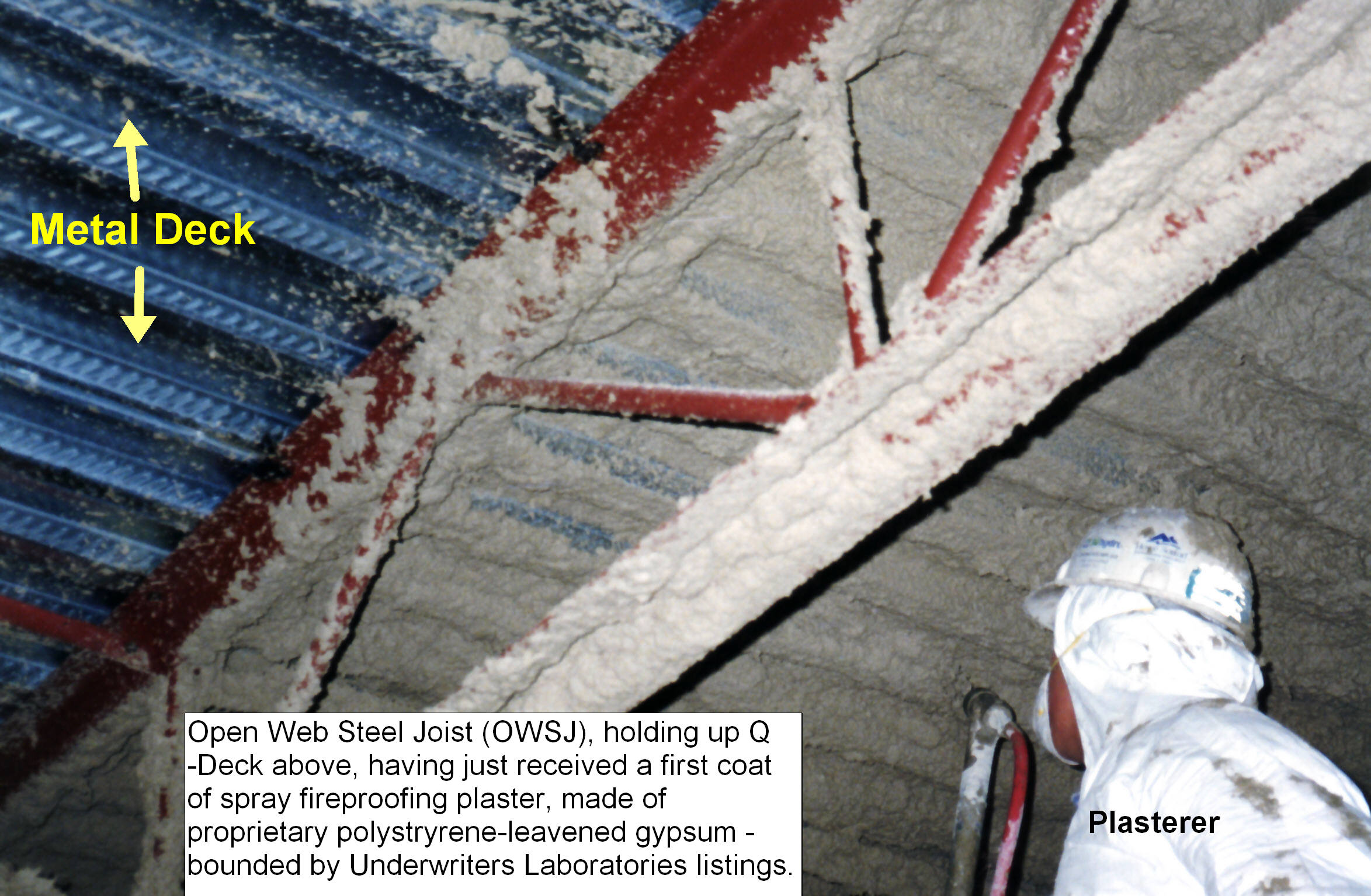
Metal deck and open web steel joist receiving spray fireproofing plaster, made of polystyrene-leavened gypsum

Steel loses strength when heated sufficiently. The critical temperature of a steel member is the temperature at which it cannot safely support its load. Building codes and structural engineering standard practice defines different critical temperatures depending on the structural element type, configuration, orientation, and loading characteristics. The critical temperature is often considered the temperature at which its yield stress has been reduced to 60% of the room temperature yield stress. In order to determine the fire resistance rating of a steel member, accepted calculations practice can be used, or a fire test can be performed, the critical temperature of which is set by the standard accepted to the Authority Having Jurisdiction, such as a building code. In Japan, this is below 400 °C. In China, Europe and North America (e.g., ASTM E-119), this is approximately 1000–1300 °F (530–810 °C). The time it takes for the steel element that is being tested to reach the temperature set by the test standard determines the duration of the fire-resistance rating. Heat transfer to the steel can be slowed by the use of fireproofing materials, thus limiting steel temperature. Common fireproofing methods for structural steel include intumescent, endothermic, and plaster coatings as well as drywall, calcium silicate cladding, and mineral wool insulating blankets.

Structural steel fireproofing materials include intumescent, endothermic and plaster coatings as well as drywall, calcium silicate cladding, and mineral or high temperature insulation wool blankets. Attention is given to connections, as the thermal expansion of structural elements can compromise fire-resistance rated assemblies.

== Manufacturing ==
Cutting workpieces to length is usually done with a bandsaw.

A beam drill line drills holes and mills slots into beams, channels and HSS elements. CNC beam drill lines are typically equipped with feed conveyors and position sensors to move the element into position for drilling, plus probing capability to determine the precise location where the hole or slot is to be cut.

For cutting irregular openings or non-uniform ends on dimensional (non-plate) elements, a cutting torch is typically used. Oxy-fuel torches are the most common technology and range from simple hand-held torches to automated CNC coping machines that move the torch head around the structural element in accordance with cutting instructions programmed into the machine.

Fabricating flat plate is performed on a plate processing center where the plate is laid flat on a stationary 'table' and different cutting heads traverse the plate from a gantry-style arm or "bridge". The cutting heads can include a punch, drill or torch.

== See also ==
- Steel frame
- Steel design
- Structural engineering
