= Aermet =

Type of martensitic alloy steel

AerMet alloy is an ultra-high strength type of martensitic alloy steel. The main alloying elements are cobalt and nickel, but chromium, molybdenum and carbon are also added. Its exceptional properties are hardness, tensile strength, fracture toughness and ductility. Aermet is weldable with no preheating needed. AerMet alloy is not corrosion resistant, so it must be sealed if used in a moist environment. AerMet is a registered trademark of Carpenter Technology Corporation.

Three types of AerMet alloys are currently available: AerMet 100 (also known as AerMet-for-Tooling), AerMet 310 and AerMet 340 alloy.

Examples of applications include armor, fasteners, airplane landing gear, ordnance, jet engine shafts, structural members and drive shafts.

== Properties ==
Chemical composition of AerMet alloys
Alloy	Carbon	Nickel	Cobalt	Chromium	Molybdenum	Iron
AerMet 100 Alloy	0.23	11.1	13.4	3.0	1.2	remainder
AerMet 310 Alloy	0.25	11	15	2.4	1.4	remainder
AerMet 340 Alloy	0.33	12.00	15.60	2.25	1.85	remainder

Properties of AerMet alloys in hardened state
Alloy	Yield strength [ksi (MPa)]	Ultimate tensile strength [ksi (MPa)]	% Elongation	Charpy V-notch impact test [ft-lbs (J)]	Fracture toughness K_{IC} [ksi-in^{½} (MPa-M^{½})]
AerMet 100 Alloy	250 (1720)	285 (1960)	14	30 (41)	115 (126)
AerMet 310 Alloy	275 (1900)	315 (2170)	14.5	20 (27)	65 (71)
AerMet 340 Alloy	300 (2070)	345 (2380)	11	11 (15)	34 (37)

== AerMet 100 Alloy ==
The UNS number is K92580. The alloy has a modulus of elasticity of 28,200 ksi and a density of 0.285 lb/in^{3} (7.89 g/cm^{3}). AerMet 100 alloy is somewhat more difficult to machine than 4340 at HRC 38. Therefore, carbide tools are usually used. Standard shapes that are available include round, sheet, welding wire, billet, plate, strip and wire.

AerMet alloy is special in that it must be hardened twice in order to reach its maximum effectiveness. The first hardening application is a solution treatment at 1,625 °F (885 °C) for 1 hour. It is then quenched to a temperature of 150 °F (66 °C) over 1 to 2 hours. It then must be cold treated, where the material is cooled to −100 °F (−73 °C) for 1 hour. The second hardening process is aging, where the material is heated to 900 °F (482 °C) for 5 hours.

== AerMet 310 Alloy ==
AerMet 310 is harder and stronger than AerMet 100 alloy while maintaining ductility and toughness. Standard shapes include round bar, wire, billet, plate, and strip. AerMet 310 is hardened with the same procedure as AerMet 100.

== AerMet 340 Alloy ==
AerMet 340 alloy has a higher strength than AerMet 310.

AerMet 340 is hardened differently from the other two varieties. The first hardening application is a solution treatment at 1,775 °F (968 °C) for 1 hour. It is then quenched to a temperature of 150 °F (66 °C) over 1 to 2 hours. The material may then be cold treated, where the material is cooled to −100 °F (−73 °C) for 1 hour. The second hardening process is aging, where the material is heated to 900 °F (482 °C) for 3 to 8 hours. If the cold treatment is skipped, the part can be aged twice to get the same results.

== See also ==
- Maraging steel (Precipitation-hardened steels with similar strength.)
- USAF-96 and Eglin steel (Inexpensive precipitation-hardened steels with high strength and lower nickel content. USAF-96 also needs no tungsten.)
