= Ultimate tensile strength =

Maximum stress withstood by stretched material before breaking

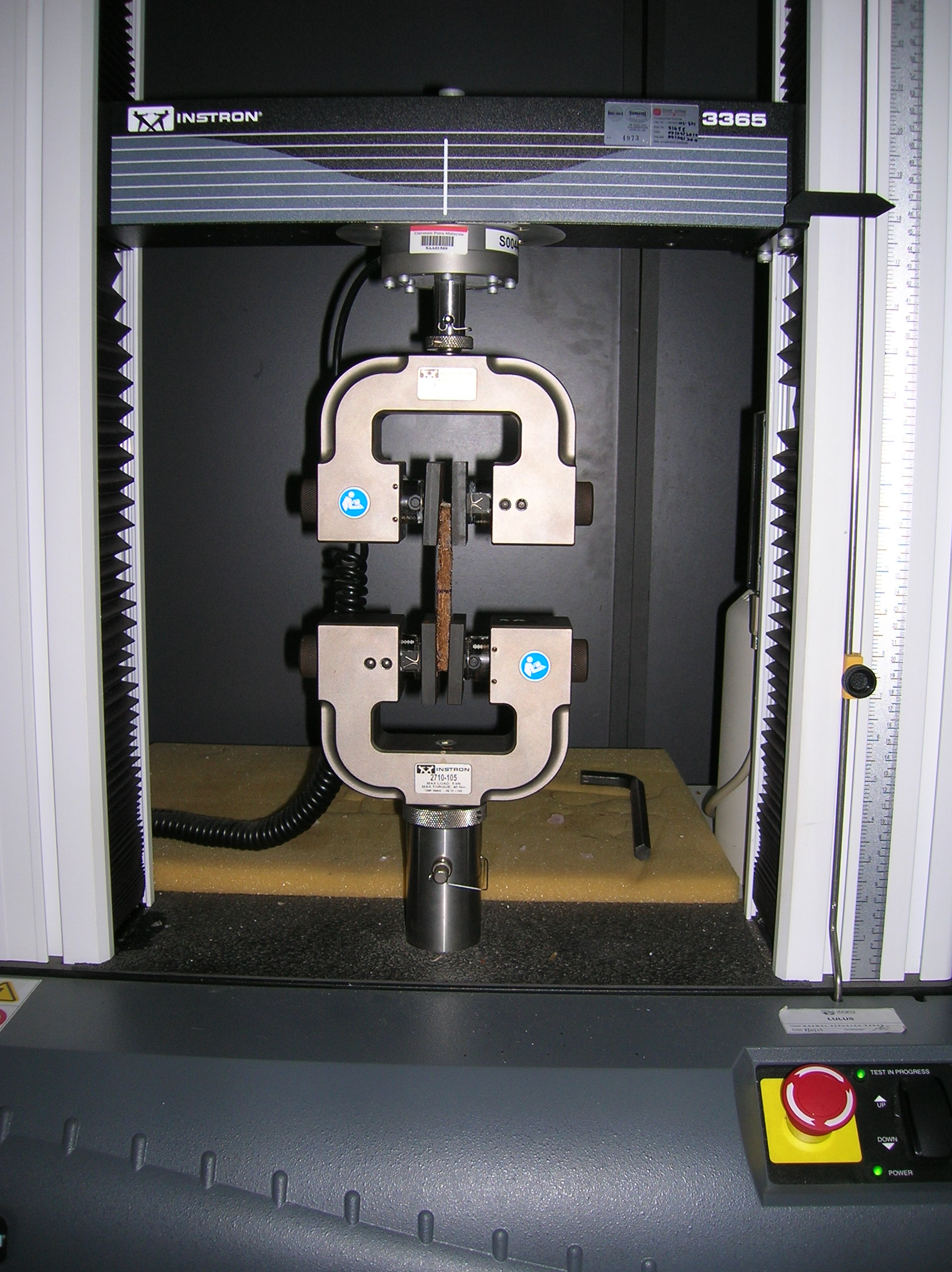
Two vises apply tension to a specimen by pulling at it, stretching the specimen until it fractures. The maximum stress it withstands before fracturing is its ultimate tensile strength.

Ultimate tensile strength (also called UTS, tensile strength, TS, ultimate strength or $F_\text{tu}$ in notation) is the maximum stress that a material can withstand while being stretched or pulled before breaking. In brittle materials, the ultimate tensile strength is close to the yield point, whereas in ductile materials, the ultimate tensile strength can be higher.

The ultimate tensile strength is usually found by performing a tensile test and recording the engineering stress versus strain. The highest point of the stress–strain curve is the ultimate tensile strength and has units of stress. The equivalent point for the case of compression, instead of tension, is called the compressive strength.

Tensile strengths are rarely of any consequence in the design of ductile members, but they are important with brittle members. They are tabulated for common materials such as alloys, composite materials, ceramics, plastics, and wood.

== Definition ==
The ultimate tensile strength of a material is an intensive property; therefore its value does not depend on the size of the test specimen. For some materials, however, it may be dependent on other factors, such as the preparation of the specimen, the presence or otherwise of surface defects, and the temperature of the test environment and material.

Some materials break very sharply, without plastic deformation, in what is called a brittle failure. Others, which are more ductile, including most metals, experience some plastic deformation and possibly necking before fracture.

Tensile strength is defined as a stress, which is measured as force per unit area. In the International System of Units (SI), the unit is the pascal (Pa) which is 1 N/m^{2} or for tensile strength more often a multiple thereof, like megapascals (MPa) or gigapascals (GPa). For some non-homogeneous materials (or for assembled components) it can be reported just as a force or as a force per unit width. A United States customary unit is pounds per square inch (lb/in^{2} or psi). Kilopounds per square inch (ksi, or sometimes kpsi) is equal to 1000 psi, and is commonly used in the United States, when measuring tensile strengths.

=== Ductile materials ===
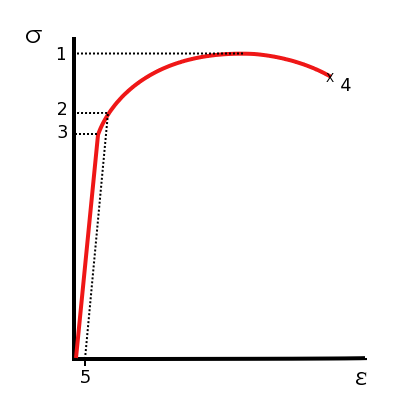
Figure 1: "Engineering" stress–strain (σ–ε) curve typical of aluminium: 1. Ultimate strength; 2. Yield strength; 3. Proportional limit stress; 4. Fracture; 5. Offset strain (typically 0.2%)

Figure 2: "Engineering" (red) and "true" (blue) stress–strain curve typical of structural steel.: 1. Ultimate strength; 2. Yield strength (yield point); 3. Rupture; 4. Strain hardening region; 5. Necking region; 1. Apparent stress (F/A_{0}); 2. Actual stress (F/A)

Many materials can display linear elastic behavior, defined by a linear stress–strain relationship, as shown in figure 1 up to point 3. The elastic behavior of materials often extends into a non-linear region, represented in figure 1 by point 2 (the "yield strength"), up to which deformations are completely recoverable upon removal of the load; that is, a specimen loaded elastically in tension will elongate, but will return to its original shape and size when unloaded. Beyond this elastic region, for ductile materials, such as steel, deformations are plastic. A plastically deformed specimen does not completely return to its original size and shape when unloaded. For many applications, plastic deformation is unacceptable, and is used as the design limitation.

After the yield point, ductile metals undergo a period of strain hardening, in which the stress increases again with increasing strain, and they begin to neck, as the cross-sectional area of the specimen decreases due to plastic flow. In a sufficiently ductile material, when necking becomes substantial, it causes a reversal of the engineering stress–strain curve (curve A, figure 2); this is because the engineering stress is calculated assuming the original cross-sectional area before necking. The reversal point is the maximum stress on the engineering stress–strain curve, and the engineering stress coordinate of this point is the ultimate tensile strength, given by point 1.

Ultimate tensile strength is not used in the design of ductile static members because design practices dictate the use of the yield stress. It is, however, used for quality control, because of the ease of testing. It is also used to roughly determine material types for unknown samples.

The ultimate tensile strength is a common engineering parameter to design members made of brittle material because such materials have no yield point.

== Testing ==
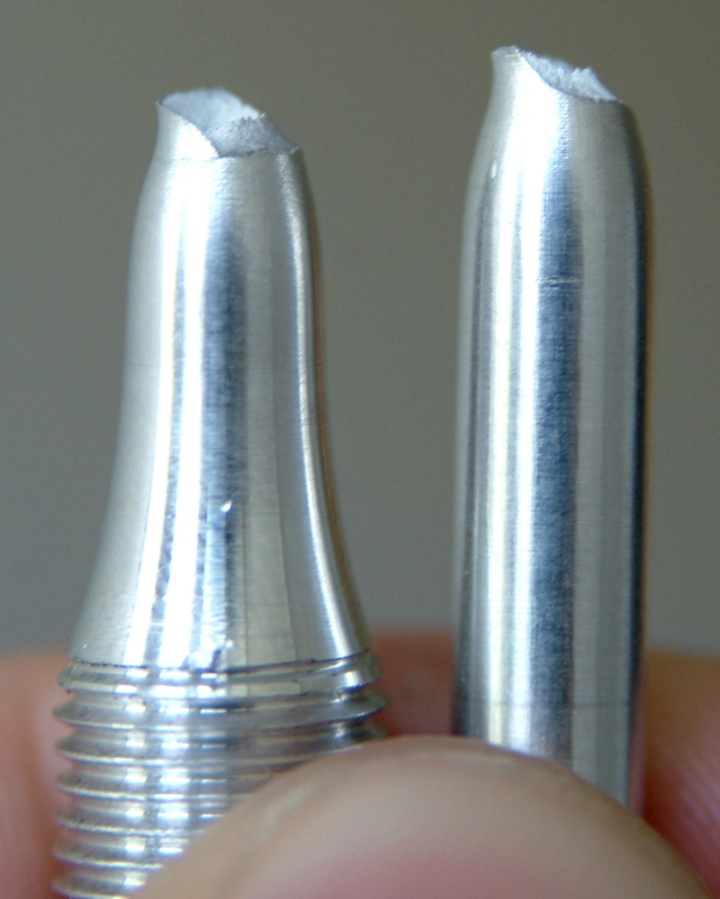
Round bar specimen after tensile stress testing

Aluminium tensile test samples after breakage

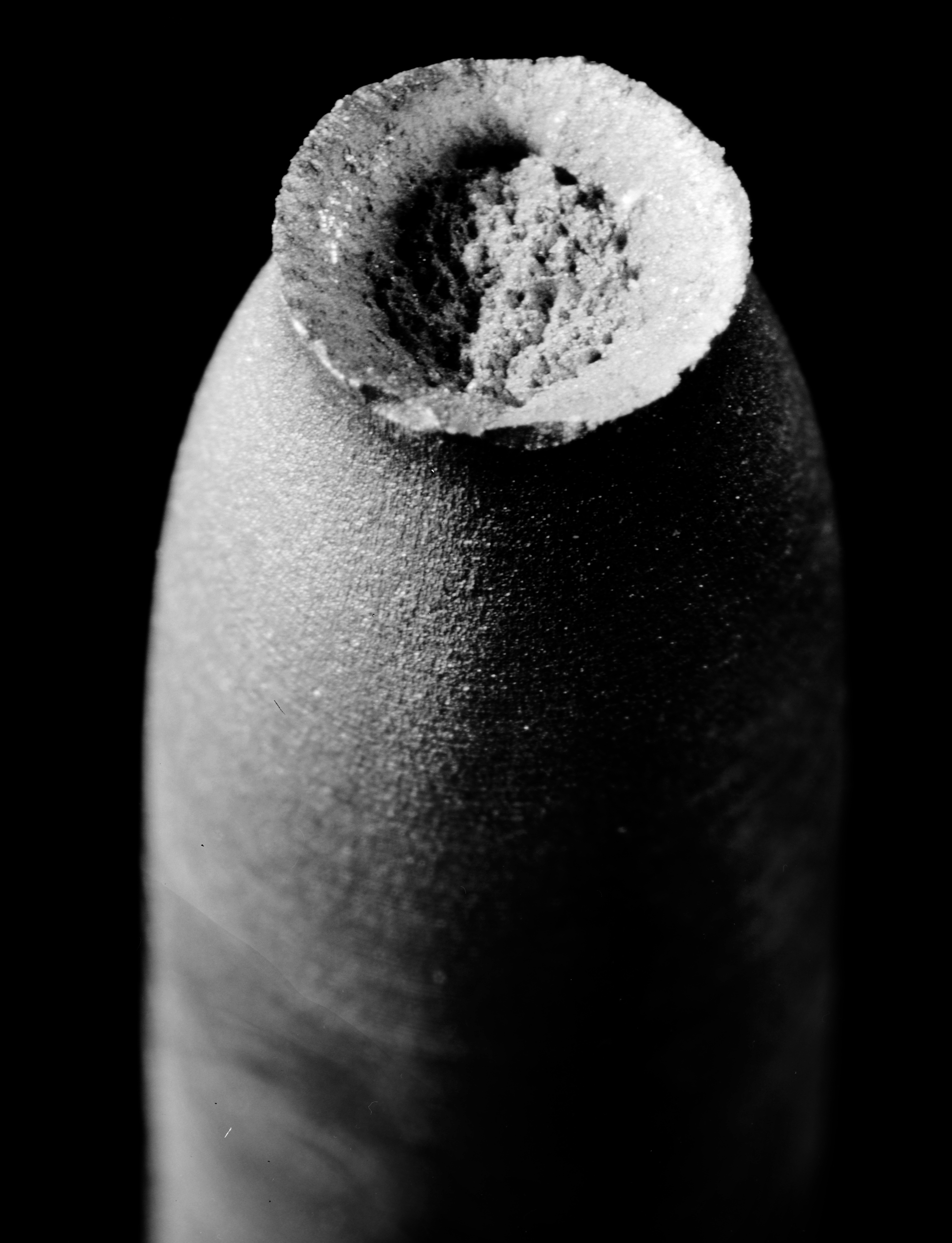
The "cup" side of the "cup–cone" characteristic failure pattern

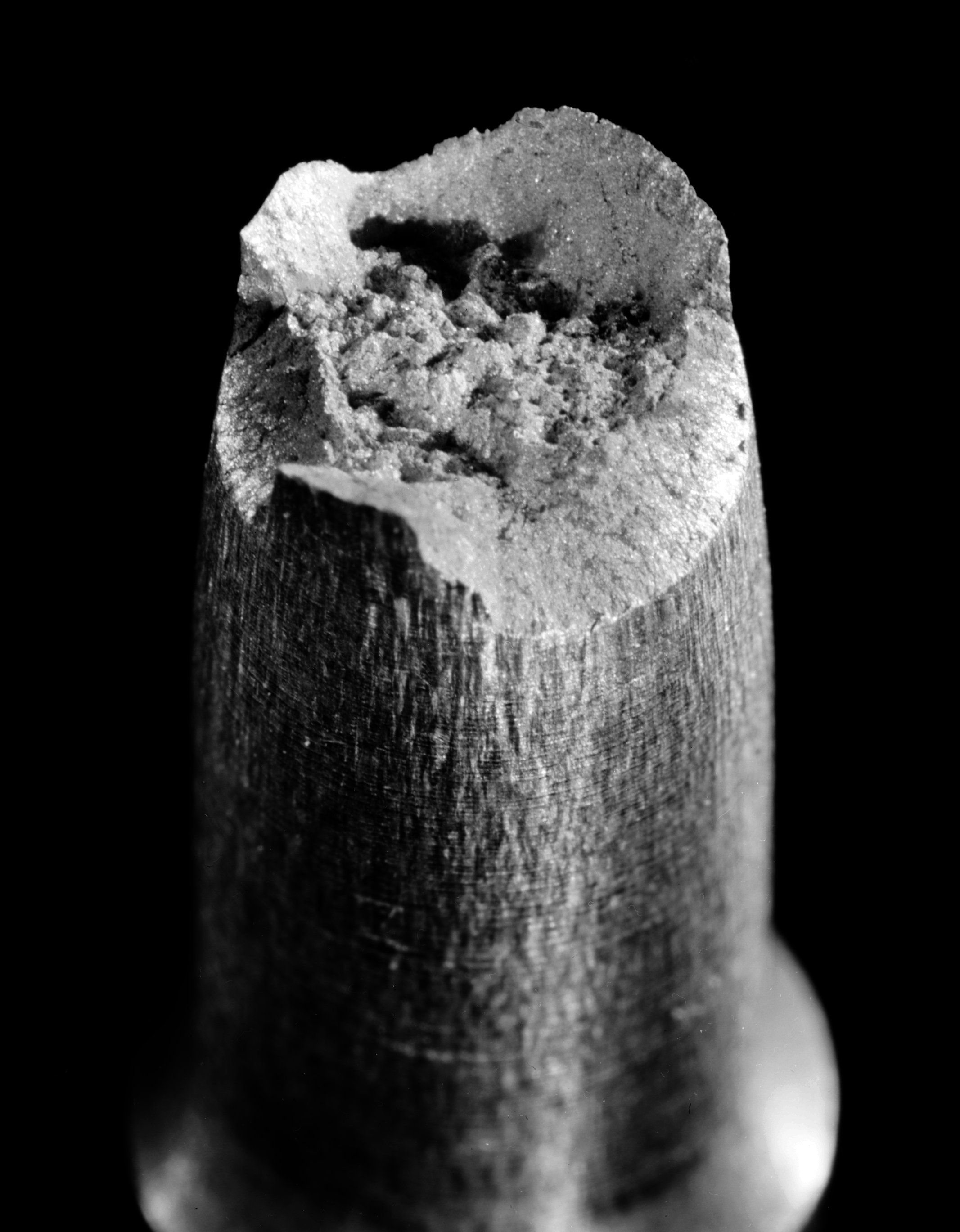
Some parts showing the "cup" shape and some showing the "cone" shape

Typically, the testing involves taking a small sample with a fixed cross-sectional area, and then pulling it with a tensometer at a constant strain (change in gauge length divided by initial gauge length) rate until the sample breaks. In metals and especially in polymers, the ultimate strength can depend significantly on the strain rate selected for the test.

When testing some metals, indentation hardness correlates linearly with tensile strength. This important relation permits economically important nondestructive testing of bulk metal deliveries with lightweight, even portable equipment, such as hand-held Rockwell hardness testers. This practical correlation helps quality assurance in metalworking industries to extend well beyond the laboratory and universal testing machines.

== Typical tensile strengths ==
Typical tensile strengths of some materials (Note: Many of the values depend on manufacturing process and purity or composition.)
Material	Yield strength (MPa)	Ultimate tensile strength (MPa)	Density (g/cm^{3})
USAF-96 Steel	1,337	1,701	7.85
Steel, structural ASTM A36 steel	250	400–550	7.8
Steel, 1090	247	841	7.58
Chromium-vanadium steel AISI 6150	620	940	7.8
Steel, 2800 Maraging steel	2,617	2,693	8.00
Steel, AerMet 340	2,160	2,430	7.86
Steel, Sandvik Sanicro 36Mo logging cable precision wire	1,758	2,070	8.00
Steel, AISI 4130, water quenched 855 °C (1,570 °F), 480 °C (900 °F) temper	951	1,110	7.85
Steel, API 5L X65	448	531	7.8
Steel, high strength alloy ASTM A514	690	760	7.8
Acrylic, clear cast sheet (PMMA)	72	87	1.16
Acrylonitrile butadiene styrene (ABS)	43	43	0.9–1.53
High-density polyethylene (HDPE)	26–33	37	0.85
Polypropylene	12–43	19.7–80	0.91
Steel, stainless AISI 302	275	620	7.86
Cast iron 4.5% C, ASTM A-48	130	200	7.3
"Liquidmetal" alloy	1,723	550–1,600	6.1
Beryllium 99.9% Be	345	448	1.84
Aluminium alloy 2014-T6	414	483	2.8
Polyester resin (unreinforced)	55	55	
Polyester and chopped strand mat laminate 30% E-glass	100	100	
S-Glass epoxy composite	2,358	2,358	
Aluminium alloy 6061-T6	241	300	2.7
Copper 99.9% Cu	70	220	8.92
Cupronickel 10% Ni, 1.6% Fe, 1% Mn, balance Cu	130	350	8.94
Brass	200 +	500	8.73
Tungsten	941	1,510	19.25
Glass, annealed		41	2.53
E-Glass	—N/a	1,500 for laminates, 3,450 for fibers alone	2.57
S-Glass	—N/a	4,710	2.48
Basalt fiber	—N/a	4,840	2.7
Marble	—N/a	15	2.6
Concrete	—N/a	2–5	2.7
Carbon fiber	—N/a	1,600 for laminates, 4,137 for fibers alone	1.75
Carbon fiber (Toray T1100G) (the strongest human-made fibres)		7,000 fibre alone	1.79
Human hair (Note: Human hair strength varies by genetics, environmental factors, and chemical treatments.)	140–160	200–250	1.32
Bamboo fiber		350–500	0.4–0.8
Spider silk (Note: The strength of spider silk is highly variable. It depends on many factors including kind of silk (Every spider can produce several for sundry purposes.), species, age of silk, temperature, humidity, swiftness at which stress is applied during testing, length stress is applied, and way the silk is gathered (forced silking or natural spinning). The value shown in the table, 1,000 MPa, is roughly representative of the results from a few studies involving several different species of spider however specific results varied greatly.)		1,000	1.3
Spider silk, Darwin's bark spider	1,652		
Silkworm silk	500		1.3
Aramid fibers (Kevlar or Twaron)		2,920-3,000	1.44
Aramid fiber impregnated epoxy (Kevlar or Twaron)		3,600	
UHMWPE	24	52	0.97
UHMWPE fibers (Dyneema or Spectra)		2,300–3,500	0.97
Vectran		2,850–3,340	1.4
Polybenzoxazole (Zylon)	2,700	5,800	1.56
Wood, pine (parallel to grain)		40	
Bone (limb)	104–121	130	1.6
Nylon, molded, 6PLA/6M		75–85	1.15
Nylon fiber, drawn		900	1.13
Epoxy adhesive	—N/a	12–30	—N/a
Rubber	—N/a	16	
Boron	—N/a	3,100	2.46
Silicon, monocrystalline (m-Si)	—N/a	7,000	2.33
Ultra-pure silica glass fiber-optic strands		4,100	
Sapphire (Al_{2}O_{3})	400 at 25 °C, 275 at 500 °C, 345 at 1,000 °C	1,900	3.9–4.1
Boron nitride nanotube	—N/a	33,000	2.62
Diamond	1,600	2,800; ~80,000–90,000 at microscale	3.5
Graphene	—N/a	intrinsic 130,000; engineering 50,000–60,000	1.0
First carbon nanotube ropes	?	3,600	1.3
Carbon nanotube (Note: Multiwalled carbon nanotubes have the highest tensile strength of any material yet measured, with one measurement of 63 GPa, still well below one theoretical value of 100 GPa. The first nanotube ropes (20 mm in length) whose tensile strength was published (in 2000) had a strength of 3.6 GPa. The density depends on the manufacturing method, and the lowest value is 0.037 or 0.55 (solid).)	—N/a	11,000–63,000	0.037–1.34
Carbon nanotube composites	—N/a	1,200	—N/a
High-strength carbon nanotube film	—N/a	9,600	—N/a
Limpet Patella vulgata teeth (goethite whisker nanocomposite)		4,900; 3,000–6,500	

== Typical properties of annealed elements ==
Typical properties for annealed elements
Element	Young's modulus (GPa)	Yield strength (MPa)	Ultimate strength (MPa)
Silicon	107		5,000–9,000
Tungsten	411	550	550–620
Iron	211	80–100	350
Titanium	120	100–225	246–370
Copper	130	117	210
Tantalum	186	180	200
Tin	47	9–14	15–200
Zinc	85–105	200–400	200–400
Nickel	170	140–350	140–195
Silver	83		170
Gold	79		100
Aluminium	70	15–20	40–50
Lead	16		12

== See also ==
- Flexural strength
- Strength of materials
- Tensile structure
- Toughness
- Structural integrity and failure
- Tension (physics)
- Young's modulus
- Limit load (physics), maximum load that a structure is expected to safely carry in service
  - Safe working load or working load limit, maximum load during normal operations specified in the interests of avoiding failure
- Ultimate load, figure used in calculations that should hopefully never actually occur
  - Minimum breaking load, the minimum load that an object can withstand before breaking
