= ASTM A53 steel =

Carbon steel pipe specification

ASTM A53 is a carbon steel alloy, used as structural steel or for low-pressure plumbing. The alloy specifications are set by ASTM International, in specification ASTM A53/A53M.

A53 pipe comes in three types and two grades, A53 Type F, which is longitudinally furnace butt welded or continuous welded (Grades A and B), A53 Type E, which is longitudinally electric resistance welded (Grades A and B), and A53 Type S, which is seamless pipe, produced by hot working, and possibly cold finishing, the steel (Grades A and B). ASTM A53 pipe is sized according to the nominal pipe size (NPS) system. It is commonly available with national pipe thread ends or with plain cut ends. It can be used for steam, water, and air conveyance. It is also weldable and can be used in structural applications, although ASTM A500 tube, which is available in the same NPS sizes, is sometime preferred.

This is a standard set by the standards organization ASTM International, a voluntary standards development organizations that sets technical standards for materials, products, systems, and services.

ASTM A53 Standard- 06A - HYSP
1. Scope of ASTM A53 Standard ASTM A53 is standard specification for pipe, steel, black and hot dipped, zinc-coated, welded and seamless. This specification covers seamless and welded black and hot-dipped galvanized steel pipe in NPS 1/8 to NPS 26 [DN 6 to DN 650] (Note 1), inclusive, with nominal wall thickness (Note 2) as given in Table X2.2 and Table X2.3. It shall be permissible to furnish pipe having other dimensions provided that such pipe complies with all other requirements of this specification. Supplementary requirements of an optional nature are provided and shall apply only when specified by the purchaser.
2. Application of ASTM A53 Standard Pipes Steel Pipes ordered under this specification is intended for mechanical and pressure applications and is also acceptable for ordinary uses in steam, water, gas, and air lines. It is suitable for welding, and suitable for forming operations involving coiling, bending, and flanging.
3. Types and Grades This specification covers the following types and grades:
3.1 Type F—Furnace-butt-welded, continuous welded Grades A and B.
3.2 Type E—Electric-resistance-welded, Grades A and B,
3.3 Type S—Seamless, Grades A and B.
Note:
Type F is not intended for flanging.
If Type S or Type E is required for close coiling or cold bending, Grade A is the preferred grade; however, this is not intended to prohibit the cold bending of Grade B pipe.
Type E is furnished either nonexpanded or cold expanded at the option of the manufacturer.
4. Materials and Manufacture of ASTM A53 Pipes
4.1 The steel for both seamless and welded pipe shall be made by one or more of the following processes: open-hearth, electric-furnace, or basic-oxygen.
4.2 If steels of different grades are sequentially strand cast, identification of the resultant transition material is required. The steel producer shall remove the transition material by any established procedure that positively separates the grades.
4.3 The weld seam of electric-resistance welded pipe in Grade B shall be heat treated after welding to a minimum of 1000 °F [540 °C] so that no untempered martensite remains, or otherwise processed in such a manner that no untempered martensite remains.
4.4 When pipe is cold expanded, the amount of expansion shall not exceed one and one-half percent (1-1/2%) of the specified outside diameter of the pipe.
APPLICATIONS
ASTM A53 pipeline is planned for mechanical as well as pressure applications and is also appropriate for ordinary usages in vapor, water, gas and also air lines.
