= A572 steel =

Type of American structural steel

ASTM A572 steel is a common high strength, low alloy (HSLA) structural steel used in the United States. A572 steel properties are specified by ASTM International standards.

== Grades ==
A572 steel has five different grades: 42, 50, 55, 60 and 65. Each of these grades differ in their mechanical properties and chemical composition.

== Chemical Composition ==
A572 Steel Chemical Composition, Per ASTM standards
A572 Grade	Carbon	Manganese	Phosphorus	Sulfur	Silicon
Grade 42	0.21%	1.35%	0.030%	0.030%	0.15-0.40%
Grade 50	0.23%	1.35%	0.030%	0.030%	0.15-0.40%
Grade 55	0.25%	1.35%	0.030%	0.030%	0.15-0.40%
Grade 60	0.26%	1.35%	0.030%	0.030%	0.40%
Grade 65 Less Than 1/2" Thick	0.26%	1.35%	0.030%	0.030%	0.40%
Grade 65 Over 1/2" to 1 1/4" Thick	0.23%	1.65%	0.030%	0.030%	0.40%

== Material Properties ==
A572 Steel Material Properties, Per ASTM Standards
A572 Grade	Yield Point (KSI) [MPa]	Tensile Strength (KSI) [MPa]	Min. 8” Elongation %
Grade 42	42 [290]	60 [414]	20
Grade 50	50 [345]	65 [448]	18
Grade 55	55 [379]	70 [483]	17
Grade 60	60 [414]	75 [517]	16
Grade 65	65 [448]	80 [552]	15

== Forms ==
A572 steel is produced in a variety of different steel forms, which include:

- Plates
- Bars
- Structural Shapes
- Channels
- I-Beams
- Angles
- Wide Flange Beams
- Sheet Piling

== Applications ==
A572 steel is typically used in structural applications due to its high strength, ductility, weldability and corrosion resistance. These applications include structural sections, reinforcing bars, bridges, skyscrapers and houses.
