= A514 steel =

Type of high-strength steel

A514 is a particular type of high strength steel, which is quenched and tempered alloy steel, with a yield strength of 100,000 psi (100 ksi or approximately 700 MPa). The ArcelorMittal trademarked name is T-1. A514 is primarily used as a structural steel for building construction. A517 is a closely related alloy that is used for the production of high-strength pressure vessels.

This is a standard set by the standards organization ASTM International, a voluntary standards development organization that sets technical standards for materials, products, systems, and services.

== Specifications ==
=== A514 ===
The tensile yield strength of A514 alloys is specified as at least 100 ksi (689 MPa) for thicknesses up to 2.5 inches (63.5 mm) thick plate, and at least 110 ksi (758 MPa) ultimate tensile strength, with a specified ultimate range of 110–130 ksi (758–896 MPa). Plates from 2.5 to 6.0 inches (63.5 to 152.4 mm) thick have specified strength of 90 ksi (621 MPa) (yield) and 100–130 ksi (689–896 MPa) (ultimate).

=== A517 ===
A517 steel has equal tensile yield strength, but slightly higher specified ultimate strength of 115–135 ksi (793–931 MPa) for thicknesses up to 2.5 inches (63.5 mm) and 105–135 ksi (724–931 MPa) for thicknesses 2.5 to 6.0 inches (63.5 to 152.4 mm).

== Usage ==
A514 steels are used where a weldable, machinable, very high strength steel is required to save weight or meet ultimate strength requirements. It is normally used as a structural steel in building construction, cranes, or other large machines supporting high loads.

In addition, A514 steels are specified by military standards (ETL 18-11) for use as small-arms firing range baffles and deflector plates.
