= Weld access hole =

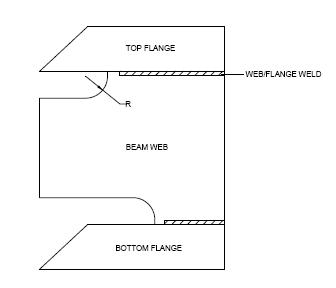
Side view of a beam with two weld access holes cut into the web. Also the flanges have been beveled in preparation for welding.

The weld access hole or rat hole is a structural engineering technique in which a part of the web of an I-beam or T-beam is cut out at the end or ends of the beam. The hole in the web allows a welder to weld the flange to another part of the structure with a continuous weld the full width on both top and bottom sides of the flange. Without the weld access hole, the middle of the flange would be blocked by the web and inaccessible for welding.

The hole also minimizes the induction of thermal stresses with a combination of partially releasing the welded section, avoiding welding the T section where the flange joins the web and improving cooling conditions.

The configuration adopted for web access holes affects how the beam joint will bend when under stress.

== Complete penetration ==
Wide-flange I-beam.

Welds may be classified as either Complete Joint Penetration (CJP) or Partial Joint Penetration (PJP). CJP welds extend completely through the thickness of components joined. A CJP weld transmits the full load-carrying capacity of the structural components joined, and is important for seismic safety.

Complete penetration usually requires welding on both sides of a joint. Weld access holes in the web of a beam make it possible to weld both sides of a flange, making the flange joint stronger, at the expense of the web joint.

The strength of a flange joint is important, because the flange resists bending moment of a beam.

== See also ==
- EN 1993
