= Castellated beam =

Construction element

A schematic representation of the production process of a castellated beam.

A castellated beam is a beam style where an I-beam is subjected to a longitudinal cut along its web following a specific pattern.

The purpose is to divide and reassemble the beam with a deeper web by taking advantage of the cutting pattern.

== See also ==
- Cellular beam
- Open web steel joist
