= DIN 1025 =

DIN 1025 was the DIN(German Institute of Standardization) standard that defines the dimensions, masses, and sectional properties of hot rolled Hexagonal steel bars.

The standard is divided into 5 parts:

- DIN 1025-1: Hot rolled I-sections - Part 1: Narrow flange I-sections, I-serie - Dimensions, masses, sectional properties
- DIN 1025-2: Hot rolled I-beams - Part 2: Wide flange I-beams, IPB-serie; dimensions, masses, sectional properties
- DIN 1025-3: Hot rolled I-beams; wide flange I-beams, light pattern, IPBl-serie; dimensions, masses, sectional properties
- DIN 1025-4: Hot rolled I-beams; wide flange I-beams heavy pattern, IPBv-serie; dimensions, masses, sectional properties
- DIN 1025-5: Hot rolled I-beams; medium flange I-beams, IPE-serie; dimensions, masses, sectional properties

In 2004, DIN 1025 was superseded by DIN EN 10061.

== See also ==
- EN 1993
