= Steel design =

Steel Design, or more specifically, Structural Steel Design, is an area of structural engineering used to design steel structures. These structures include schools, houses, bridges, commercial centers, tall buildings, warehouses, aircraft, ships and stadiums. The design and use of steel frames are commonly employed in the design of steel structures. More advanced structures include steel plates and shells.

In structural engineering, a structure is a body or combination of pieces of the rigid bodies in space that form a fitness system for supporting loads and resisting moments. The effects of loads and moments on structures are determined through structural analysis. A steel structure is composed of structural members that are made of steel, usually with standard cross-sectional profiles and standards of chemical composition and mechanical properties. The depth of steel beams used in the construction of bridges is usually governed by the maximum moment, and the cross-section is then verified for shear strength near supports and lateral torsional buckling (by determining the distance between transverse members connecting adjacent beams). Steel column members must be verified as adequate to prevent buckling after axial and moment requirements are met.

There are currently two common methods of steel design: The first method is the Allowable Strength Design (ASD) method. The second is the Load and Resistance Factor Design (LRFD) method. Both use a strength, or ultimate level design approach.

== Load combination equations ==
=== Allowable Strength Design ===
For ASD, the required strength, R_{a}, is determined from the following load combinations (according to the AISC SCM, 13 ed.) and:

D + F
D + H + F + L + T
D + H + F + (L_{r} or S or R)
D + H + F + 0.75(L + T) + 0.75(L_{r} or S or R)
D + H + F ± (0.6W or 0.7E)
D + H + F + (0.75W or 0.7E) + 0.75L + 0.75(L_{r} or S or R)
0.6D + 0.6W
0.6D ± 0.7E

where:

- D = dead load,
- D_{i} = weight of Ice,
- E = earthquake load,
- F = load due to fluids with well-defined pressures and maximum heights,
- F_{a} = flood load,
- H = load due to lateral earth pressure, ground water pressure, or pressure of bulk materials,
- L = live load due to occupancy,
- L_{r} = roof live load,
- S = snow load,
- R = nominal load due to initial rainwater or ice, exclusive of the ponding contribution,
- T = self straining load,
- W = wind load,
- W_{i} = wind on ice..

Special Provisions exist for accounting flood loads and atmospheric loads i.e. D_{i} and W_{i}

Note that Allowable Strength Design is NOT equivalent to Allowable Stress Design, as governed by AISC 9th Edition. Allowable Strength Design still uses a strength, or ultimate level, design approach.

=== Load and Resistance Factor Design ===
For LRFD, the required strength, R_{u}, is determined from the following factored load combinations:

1.4(D + F)
1.2(D + F + T) + 1.6(L + H) + 0.5(L_{r} or S or R)
1.2D + 1.6(L_{r} or S or R) + (L or 0.8W)
1.2D + 1.0W + L + 0.5(L_{r} or S or R)
1.2D ± 1.0E + L + 0.2S + 0.9D + 1.6W + 1.6H
0.9D + 1.6 H ± (1.6W or 1.0E)

where the letters for the loads are the same as for ASD.

== AISC Steel Construction Manual ==
The American Institute of Steel Construction (AISC), Inc. publishes the Steel Construction Manual (Steel construction manual, or SCM), which is currently in its 16th edition. Structural engineers use this manual in analyzing, and designing various steel structures. Some of the chapters of the book are as follows.

- Dimensions and properties of various types of steel sections available on the market (W, S, C, WT, HSS, etc.)
- General Design Considerations
- Design of Flexural Members
- Design of Compression Members
- Design of Tension members
- Design of Members Subject to Combined Loading
- Design Consideration for Bolts
- Design Considerations for Welds
- Design of Connecting Elements
- Design of Simple Shear Connections
- Design of Flexure Moment Connections
- Design of Fully Restrained (FR) Moment Connections
- Design of Bracing Connections and Truss Connections
- Design of Beam Bearing Plates, Column Base Plates, Anchor Rods, and Column Splices
- Design of Hanger Connections, Bracket Plates, and Crane-Rail Connections
- General Nomenclature
- Specification and Commentary for Structural Steel Buildings
- RCSC Specification and Commentary for Structural Joints Using High-Strength Bolts
- Code of Standard Practice and Commentary for Structural Steel Buildings and Bridges
- Miscellaneous Data and Mathematical Information

== CISC Handbook of Steel Construction ==
Canadian Institute of Steel Construction publishes the "CISC Handbook of steel Construction". CISC is a national industry organization representing the structural steel, open-web steel joist and steel plate fabrication industries in Canada. It serves the same purpose as the AISC manual, but conforms with Canadian standards.

== See also ==
- Structural steel
