= Open web steel joist =

Lightweight steel truss

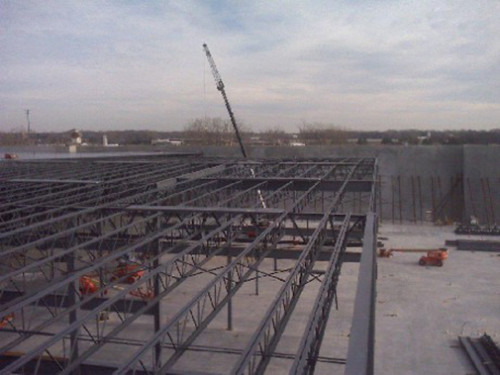
Steel joists and Joist Girders being erected.

In structural engineering, the open web steel joist (OWSJ) is a lightweight steel truss consisting, in the standard form, of parallel chords and a triangulated web system, proportioned to span between bearing points.

The main function of an OWSJ is to provide direct support for roof or floor deck and to transfer the load imposed on the deck to the structural frame i.e. beam and column.

In order to accurately design an OWSJ, engineers consider the joist span between bearing points, joist spacing, slope, live loads, dead loads, collateral loads, seismic loads, wind uplift, deflection criteria and maximum joist depth allowed. Many steel joist manufacturers supply economical load tables in order to allow designers to select the most efficient joist sizes for their projects.

While OWSJs can be adapted to suit a wide variety of architectural applications, the greatest economy will be realized when utilizing standard details, which may vary from one joist manufacturer to another. Some other shapes, in addition to the parallel top and bottom chord, are single slope, double slope, arch, gable and scissor configurations. These shapes may not be available from all joist manufacturers, and are usually supplied at a premium cost that reflects the complexity required.

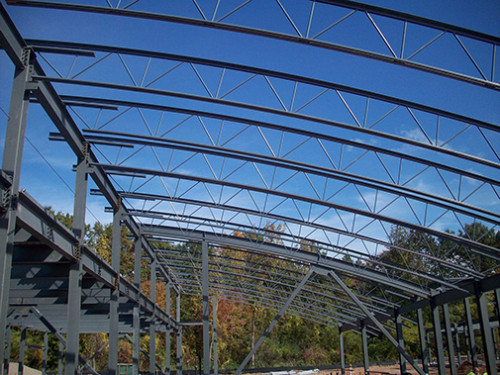
Arch steel joists being erected.

The manufacture of OWSJ in North America is overseen by the Steel Joist Institute (SJI). The SJI has worked since 1928 to maintain sound engineering practice throughout the industry. As a non-profit organization of active manufacturers, the Institute cooperates with governmental and business agencies to establish steel joist standards. Continuing research and updating are included in this work. Load tables and specifications are published by the SJI in five categories: K-Series, LH-Series, DLH-Series, CJ-Series, and Joist Girders. Load tables are available in both Allowable Stress Design (ASD) and Load and Resistance Factor Design (LRFD).

== History ==
The first joist in 1923 was a Warren truss type, with top and bottom chords of round bars and a web formed from a single continuous bent bar. Various other types were developed, but problems also followed because each manufacturer had their own design and fabrication standards. Architects, engineers and builders found it difficult to compare rated capacities and to use fully the economies of steel joist construction.

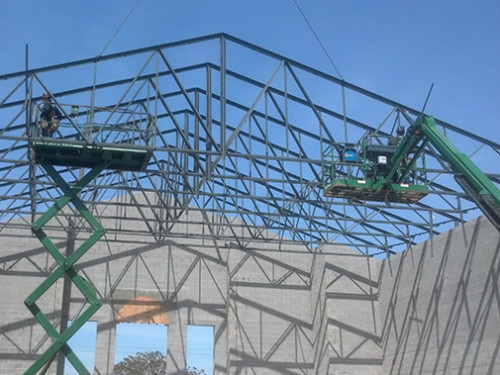
Gable steel joists being erected.

Members of the industry began to organize the institute, and in 1928 the first standard specifications were adopted, followed in 1929 by the first load table. The joists covered by these early standards were later identified as open web steel joists, SJ-Series.

== K-Series ==
Open Web Steel Joists, K-Series, were primarily developed to provide structural support for floors and roofs of buildings. They possess multiple advantages and features which have resulted in their wide use and acceptance throughout the United States and other countries.

K-Series Joists are standardized regarding depths, spans, and load-carrying capacities. There are 63 separate designations in the Load Tables, representing joist depths from 10 inches (250 mm) through 30 inches (760 mm) in 2 inches (51 mm) increments and spans through 60 feet (18,000 mm). Standard K-Series Joists have a 2 1/2 inches (64 mm) end bearing depth so that, regardless of the overall joist depths, the tops of the joists lie in the same plane. Seat depths deeper than 2 1/2 inches (64 mm) can also be specified.

Standard K-Series Joists are designed for simple span uniform loading which results in a parabolic moment diagram for chord forces and a linearly sloped shear diagram for web forces. When non-uniform and/or concentrated loads are encountered the shear and moment diagrams required may be shaped quite differently and may not be covered by the shear and moment design envelopes of a standard K-Series Joist. When conditions such as this arise, a KCS joist may be a good option.

=== KCS Joists ===
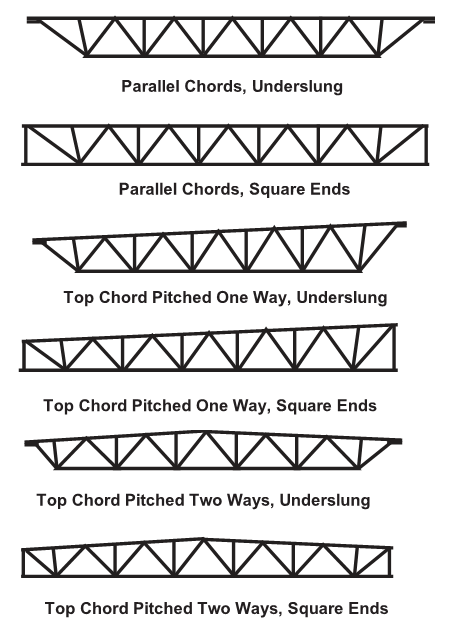
Common steel joist chord and web configurations.

KCS (K-Series Constant Shear) joists are designed in accordance with the Standard Specification for K-Series Joists.

KCS joist chords are designed for a flat positive moment envelope. The moment capacity is constant at all interior panels. All webs are designed for a vertical shear equal to the specified shear capacity and interior webs will be designed for 100% stress reversal.

== LH- and DLH-Series ==
Longspan (LH) and Deep Longspan (DLH) Steel Joists are relatively light weight shop-manufactured steel trusses used in the direct support of floor or roof slabs or decks between walls, beams, and main structural members.

The LH- and DLH-Series have been designed for the purpose of extending the use of joists to spans and loads in excess of those covered by Open Web Steel Joists, K-Series.

LH-Series Joists have been standardized in depths from 18 inches (460 mm) through 48 inches (1,200 mm), for spans through 96 feet (29,000 mm).

DLH-Series Joists have been standardized in depths from 52 inches (1,300 mm) through 120 inches (3,000 mm), for spans up through 240 feet (73,000 mm).

Longspan and Deep Longspan Steel Joists can be furnished with either underslung or square ends, with parallel chords or with single or double pitched top chords to provide sufficient slope for roof drainage. Square end joists are primarily intended for bottom chord bearing.

The depth of the bearing seat at the ends of underslung LH- and DLH-Series Joists have been established at 5 inches (130 mm) for chord section number 2 through 17. A bearing seat depth of 7 1/2 inches (190 mm) has been established for the DLH Series chord section number 18 through 25.

== CJ-Series ==
Open Web Composite Steel Joists, CJ-Series, were developed to provide structural support for floors and roofs which incorporate an overlying concrete slab while also allowing the steel joist and slab to act together as an integral unit after the concrete has adequately cured.

The CJ-Series Joists are capable of supporting larger floor or roof loadings due to the attachment of the concrete slab to the top chord of the composite joist. Shear connection between the concrete slab and steel joist is typically made by the welding of shear studs through the steel deck to the underlying CJ-Series Composite Steel Joist.

== Joist Girders ==
Joist Girders are open web steel trusses used as primary framing members. They are designed as simple spans supporting equally spaced concentrated loads for a floor or roof system. These concentrated loads are considered to act at the panel points of the Joist Girders.

These members have been standardized for depths from 20 to 120 inches (510 to 3,050 mm), and spans to 120 feet (37,000 mm).

The standard depth at the bearing ends has been established at 7 1/2 inches (190 mm) for all Joist Girders. Joist Girders are usually attached to the columns by bolting with two 3/4 inch (19 mm) diameter A325 bolts.

== See also ==
- I-beam
- Structural steel
