= ASTM A500 =

Carbon steel structural tubing specification

ASTM A500 is a standard specification published by the ASTM for cold-formed welded and seamless carbon steel structural tubing in round, square, and rectangular shapes. It is the most commonly specified ASTM standard in the US for hollow structural sections. Another related standard is ASTM A501, which is a hot-formed version of this A500. Other HSS ASTM Standards include ASTM A1065, ASTM A1085 and ASTM A847. CSA G40.21 is the preferred HSS standard in Canada.

ASTM A500 defines four grades of carbon steel based primarily on material strength. This is a standard set by the standards organization ASTM International, a voluntary standards development organization that sets technical standards for materials, products, systems, and services.

== Density ==
Like other carbon steels, A500 and A501 steels have a specific gravity of approximately 7.85, and therefore a density of approximately 7850 kg/m^{3} (0.284 pounds per cubic inch).

== Grades ==
A500 cold-formed tubing comes in four grades based on chemical composition, tensile strength, and heat treatment. The most commonly specified and utilized is Grade C. The minimum copper content is optional. Grade D must be heat treated.

Grade	UNS	Composition (% by weight in heat)					Minimum strength requirements			
Grade	UNS	C	Mn	P	S	Cu	tensile	yield (round)	yield (shaped)	elongation
Grade	UNS	max %	max %	max %	max %	min %	MPa (ksi)	MPa (ksi)	MPa (ksi)	%
A	K03000	0.26	1.35	0.035	0.035	0.20	310 (45)	230 (33)	270 (39)	25
B	K03000	0.26	1.35	0.035	0.035	0.20	400 (58)	290 (42)	315 (46)	23
C	K02705	0.23	1.35	0.035	0.035	0.20	425 (62)	315 (46)	345 (50)	21
D	K03000	0.26	1.35	0.035	0.035	0.20	400 (58)	250 (36)	250 (36)	23

=== Mechanical Properties ===
==== Shaped structural tubing ====
Grade	Physical Properties		Mechanical Properties			
Grade	Density		Tensile Strength, Ultimate		Tensile Strength, Yield	
Grade	gram/ cubic cm	lb/cubic in	MPa	psi	MPa	psi
A	7.80	0.282	310	45000	270	39000
B		.305	400	58000	315	46000
C			425	62000	345	50000
D			400	58000	250	36000
