= A36 steel =

Structural steel standard

A36 steel is a common structural steel alloy used in the United States. The A36 (UNS K02600) standard was established by the ASTM International. The standard was published in 1960 and has been updated several times since. Prior to 1960, the dominant standards for structural steel in North America were A7 (until 1967) and A9 (for buildings, until 1940). Note that SAE/AISI A7 and A9 tool steels are not the same as the obsolete ASTM A7 and A9 structural steels.

== Chemical composition ==
Chemical composition (%, ≤) for shapes
Standard	C	Si	Mn	P	S	Cu	Fe
ASTM A36/A36M	0.26	0.40	1.03	0.04	0.05	0.20	98.0

Note: For shapes with a flange thickness more than 3 in (76 mm), 0.85-1.35% manganese content and 0.15-0.40% silicon content are required.

== Properties ==
As with most steels, A36 has a density of 0.28 pounds mass per cubic inch (7.8 grams per cubic centimeter). Young's modulus for A36 steel is 29,000 kilopounds per square inch (200 gigapascals). A36 steel has a Poisson's ratio of 0.26 and a shear modulus of 11,500 ksi (79.3 GPa).

A36 steel in plates, bars, and shapes with a thickness of less than 8 inches (203 millimeters) has a minimum yield strength of 36 ksi (250 MPa) and ultimate tensile strength of 58–80 ksi (400–550 MPa). Plates thicker than 8 inches have a 32 ksi (220 MPa) yield strength and the same ultimate tensile strength of 58–80 ksi (400–550 MPa). The electrical resistance of A36 is 0.142 μΩm at 68 °F (20 °C). A36 bars and shapes maintain their ultimate strength up to 650 °F (343 °C). Above that temperature, the minimum strength drops off from 58 ksi (400 MPa): 54 ksi (370 MPa) at 700 °F (371 °C); 45 ksi (310 MPa) at 750 °F (399 °C); 37 ksi (260 MPa) at 800 °F (427 °C).

== Fabricated forms ==
A36 is produced in a wide variety of forms, including:

- Plates
- Structural Shapes
- Bars
- Girders
- Angle iron
- T iron

== Methods of joining ==
A36 is readily welded by all welding processes. As a result, the most common welding methods for A36 are the cheapest and easiest: shielded metal arc welding (SMAW, or stick welding), gas metal arc welding (GMAW, or MIG welding), and oxyacetylene welding. A36 steel is also commonly bolted and riveted in structural applications. High-strength bolts have largely replaced structural steel rivets. Indeed, the latest steel construction specifications published by AISC (the 15th Edition) no longer covers their installation.

== See also ==
- Structural steel
