= Glossary of structural engineering =

This glossary of structural engineering terms pertains specifically to structural engineering and its sub-disciplines. Please see Glossary of engineering for a broad overview of the major concepts of engineering.

Most of the terms listed in glossaries are already defined and explained within itself. However, glossaries like this one are useful for looking up, comparing and reviewing large numbers of terms together. You can help enhance this page by adding new terms or writing definitions for existing ones.

== A ==
- Abutment – refers to the substructure at the ends of a bridge span or dam whereon the structure's superstructure rests or contacts.
- Acre – is a unit of land area used in the imperial and US customary systems. It is traditionally defined as the area of one chain by one furlong (66 by 660 feet), which is exactly equal to 10 square chains, 1/640 of a square mile, or 43,560 square feet, and approximately 4,047 m^{2}, or about 40% of a hectare.
- Acrow prop – or BS prop is a piece of construction equipment. It is a telescopic tubular steel prop, used as a temporary support. A jackscrew is similar but not as long and not telescopic. Outside the UK an Acrow prop may be known as a jack post, adjustable post, telescoping prop or ... post, screw jack, adjustable steel column, adjustable steel prop or ... post, adjustable metal prop or ... post, as well as an adjustable shoring post or shore post.
- Adhesion – is the tendency of dissimilar particles or surfaces to cling to one another (cohesion refers to the tendency of similar or identical particles/surfaces to cling to one another). The forces that cause adhesion and cohesion can be divided into several types. The intermolecular forces responsible for the function of various kinds of stickers and sticky tape fall into the categories of chemical adhesion, dispersive adhesion, and diffusive adhesion. In addition to the cumulative magnitudes of these intermolecular forces, there are also certain emergent mechanical effects.
- Aggregate (composite) – is the component of a composite material that resists compressive stress and provides bulk to the composite material. For efficient filling, aggregate should be much smaller than the finished item, but have a wide variety of sizes. For example, the particles of stone used to make concrete typically include both sand and gravel.
- Aggregate (construction) – Construction aggregate is a broad category of coarse to medium grained particulate material used in construction, including sand, gravel, crushed stone, slag, recycled concrete and geosynthetic aggregates.
- Air conditioning – (often referred to as 'AC, A/C, or air con) is the process of removing heat and moisture from the interior of an occupied space to improve the comfort of occupants. Air conditioning can be used in both domestic and commercial environments.
- All-in ballast – In structural engineering, all-in-ballast is a pre-mixed aggregate of sharp sand and gravel used specifically for making concrete. The term "all-in" refers to the fact that the components are already combined in the correct proportions, removing the need for separate sourcing and mixing of sand and gravel.
- Alloy –is a combination of metals or of a metal and another element. Alloys are defined by a metallic bonding character. An alloy may be a solid solution of metal elements (a single phase) or a mixture of metallic phases (two or more solutions). Intermetallic compounds are alloys with a defined stoichiometry and crystal structure. Zintl phases are also sometimes considered alloys depending on bond types.
- American National Standards Institute – is a private non-profit organization that oversees the development of voluntary consensus standards for products, services, processes, systems, and personnel in the United States. The organization also coordinates U.S. standards with international standards so that American products can be used worldwide.
- Annealing (metallurgy) – in metallurgy and materials science, is a heat treatment that alters the physical and sometimes chemical properties of a material to increase its ductility and reduce its hardness, making it more workable. It involves heating a material above its recrystallization temperature, maintaining a suitable temperature for a suitable amount of time, and then cooling.
- ANSI – American National Standards Institute.
- Arch – is a vertical curved structure that spans an elevated space and may or may not support the weight above it, or in case of a horizontal arch like an arch dam, the hydrostatic pressure against it.
- Arching or compressive membrane action in reinforced concrete slabs –
- Architecture – is both the process and the product of planning, designing, and constructing buildings or any other structures. Architectural works, in the material form of buildings, are often perceived as cultural symbols and as works of art. Historical civilizations are often identified with their surviving architectural achievements.
- Architectural engineering –
- Architrave – also called an epistyle; is the lintel or beam that rests on the capitals of the columns. It is an architectural element in Classical architecture. The term can also be applied to all sides, including the vertical members, of a frame with mouldings around a door or window. The word architrave is also used to refer more generally to a style of mouldings (or other elements) framing the top of a door, window or other rectangular opening, where the horizontal "head" casing extends across the tops of the vertical side casings where the elements join (creating a butt joint, as opposed to a miter joint).
- Ashlar – is finely dressed (cut, worked) stone, either an individual stone that has been worked until squared or the structure built of it. Ashlar is the finest stone masonry unit, generally cuboid, mentioned by Vitruvius as opus isodomum, or less frequently trapezoidal. Precisely cut "on all faces adjacent to those of other stones", ashlar is capable of very thin joints between blocks, and the visible face of the stone may be quarry-faced or feature a variety of treatments: tooled, smoothly polished or rendered with another material for decorative effect.
- Austenitization – means to heat the iron, iron-based metal, or steel to a temperature at which it changes crystal structure from ferrite to austenite. The more open structure of the austenite is then able to absorb carbon from the iron-carbides in carbon steel. An incomplete initial austenitization can leave undissolved carbides in the matrix. For some iron metals, iron-based metals, and steels, the presence of carbides may occur during the austenitization step. The term commonly used for this is two-phase austenitization.

== B ==
- Ballast – is material that is used to provide stability to a vehicle or structure. Ballast, other than cargo, may be placed in a vehicle, often a ship or the gondola of a balloon or airship, to provide stability.
- Barrier cable – is a vehicular or pedestrian restraint system. It consists of a steel strand which is similar to the strand used in post-tensioned concrete.
- Beam – is a structural element that primarily resists loads applied laterally to the beam's axis. Its mode of deflection is primarily by bending. The loads applied to the beam result in reaction forces at the beam's support points. The total effect of all the forces acting on the beam is to produce shear forces and bending moments within the beam, that in turn induce internal stresses, strains and deflections of the beam. Beams are characterized by their manner of support, profile (shape of cross-section), length, and their material.
- Bearing capacity – is the capacity of soil to support the loads applied to the ground. The bearing capacity of soil is the maximum average contact pressure between the foundation and the soil which should not produce shear failure in the soil. Ultimate bearing capacity is the theoretical maximum pressure which can be supported without failure; allowable bearing capacity is the ultimate bearing capacity divided by a factor of safety. Sometimes, on soft soil sites, large settlements may occur under loaded foundations without actual shear failure occurring; in such cases, the allowable bearing capacity is based on the maximum allowable settlement. There are three modes of failure that limit bearing capacity: general shear failure, local shear failure, and punching shear failure.
- Bending – In applied mechanics, bending, (also known as flexure), characterizes the behavior of a slender structural element subjected to an external load applied perpendicularly to a longitudinal axis of the element.
- Bending moment – is the reaction induced in a structural element when an external force or moment is applied to the element causing the element to bend.
- Benefit–cost analysis – Cost–benefit analysis (CBA), sometimes called benefit costs analysis (BCA), is a systematic approach to estimating the strengths and weaknesses of alternatives used to determine options which provide the best approach to achieving benefits while preserving savings (for example, in transactions, activities, and functional business requirements). A CBA may be used to compare completed or potential courses of actions, or to estimate (or evaluate) the value against the cost of a decision, project, or policy. It is commonly used in commercial transactions, business or policy decisions (particularly public policy), and project investments.
- Bent (structural) – Bents are the building blocks that define the overall shape and character of a structure. They do not have any sort of pre-defined configuration in the way that a Pratt truss does. Rather, bents are simply cross-sectional templates of structural members, i.e., rafters, joists, posts, pilings, etc., that repeat on parallel planes along the length of the structure. The term bent is not restricted to any particular material. Bents may be formed of wooden piles, timber framing, steel framing, or even concrete.
- Bistable structure –
- Brick – is building material used to make walls, pavements and other elements in masonry construction. Traditionally, the term brick referred to a unit composed of clay, but it is now used to denote rectangular units made of clay-bearing soil, sand, and lime, or concrete materials. Bricks can be joined together using mortar, adhesives or by interlocking them. Bricks are produced in numerous classes, types, materials, and sizes which vary with region and time period, and are produced in bulk quantities. Two basic categories of bricks are fired and non-fired bricks.
- Brickwork – is masonry produced by a bricklayer, using bricks and mortar. Typically, rows of bricks—called courses— are laid on top of one another to build up a structure such as a brick wall.
- Bridge – is a structure built to span a physical obstacle, such as a body of water, valley, or road, without closing the way underneath. It is constructed for the purpose of providing passage over the obstacle, usually something that can be detrimental to cross otherwise.
- Brittle –
- Buckling-restrained braced frame –
- Building engineering –
- Building services engineering –
- Bulk modulus –

== C ==
- Calcium aluminate cements – Calcium aluminate cements are cements consisting predominantly of hydraulic calcium aluminates. Alternative names are "aluminous cement", "high-alumina cement" and "Ciment fondu" in French. They are used in a number of small-scale, specialized applications.
- Camber beam – In building, a camber beam is a piece of timber cut archwise, and steel bent or rolled, with an obtuse angle in the middle, commonly used in platforms, as church leads, and other occasions where long and strong beams are required. The camber curve is ideally a parabola but practically a circle segment as even with modern materials and calculations, cambers are imprecise.
- Castellated beam – is a beam style where an I-beam is subjected to a longitudinal cut along its web following a specific pattern in order to divide it, and reassemble the beam with a deeper web by taking advantage of the cutting pattern.
- Cant – The cant of a railway track or camber of a road (also referred to as superelevation, cross slope or cross fall) is the rate of change in elevation (height) between the two rails or edges. This is normally greater where the railway or road is curved; raising the outer rail or the outer edge of the road providing a banked turn, thus allowing vehicles to maneuver through the curve at higher speeds than would otherwise be possible if the surface is flat or level.
- Cantilever – is a rigid structural element, such as a beam or a plate, anchored at one end to a (usually vertical) support from which it protrudes; this connection could also be perpendicular to a flat, vertical surface such as a wall.
- Cantlop Bridge –
- Carbon steel –
- Cast iron – is a group of iron-carbon alloys with a carbon content greater than 2%. Its usefulness derives from its relatively low melting temperature.
- Casting –
- Catenary –
- Cavity wall –
- Cement –
- Cement render –
- Collar beam –
- Color-tagged structure –
- Column –
- Common rafter –
- Composite order –
- Compressive strength –
- Computer-aided design –
- Computer-aided engineering –
- Concrete –
- Concrete masonry unit –
- Concrete pump –
- Construction aggregate –
- Construction engineering –
- Construction surveying –
- Corbel –
- Corinthian order –
- Corrosion –
- Corrosion fatigue –
- Corrugated galvanised iron –
- Crane –
- Cross brace –
- Cross bracing –
- Curvilinear motion –

== D ==
- Dam – is a barrier that stops or restricts the flow of water or underground streams. Reservoirs created by dams not only suppress floods but also provide water for activities such as irrigation, human consumption, industrial use, aquaculture, and navigability.
- Damp proofing –
- Damped vibration –
- Dead load –
- Deep cement mixing –
- Deep foundation –
- Deflection –
- Deformation (engineering) –
- Deformation (mechanics) –
- Density –
- Deployable structure –
- Doric order –
- Double tee –
- Dragon beam –
- Ductility –
- Dumpy level –
- Dynamic load testing –
- Dynamics –

== E ==
- Earthquake engineering – is an interdisciplinary branch of engineering that designs and analyzes structures, such as buildings and bridges, with earthquakes in mind. Its overall goal is to make such structures more resistant to earthquakes.
- Earthquake-resistant structures –
- Earthworks (engineering) –
- Edge jointing –
- Endurance time method –
- Engineering –
- Engineering brick –
- Engineering drawing –
- Engineering economics –
- Engineering ethics –
- Engineering physics –
- Environmental load –
- Engineering physics –
- Euler–Bernoulli beam equation –
- Excavator –
- Expansion joint –

== F ==
- Facade engineering –
- Falsework –
- Fascia –
- Feasibility study –
- Fibre-reinforced plastic –
- Finite element method –
- Fire protection engineering –
- First fix –
- Flange –
- Flashing –
- Flexibility (engineering) –
- Flitch beam –
- Fluid –
- Fluid mechanics –
- Fluid physics –
- Fluid statics –
- Force –
- Force lines –
- Formwork –
- Foundation –
- Fracture toughness –
- Framing –
- Friction –
- Furring –

== G ==
- Gable –
- Grating –
- Gravel –
- Gravity-based structure –
- Green roof –
- Grout –

== H ==
- H-beam –
- Half-timbering –
- Hammerbeam roof –
- Hardness –
- Hardwood –
- Header –
- Henderson–Hasselbalch equation –
- High strength bolt –
- High-tensile steel –
- Hip roof –
- Hod –
- Hoist –
- Hollow structural section –
- Honeycomb structure –
- Hydraulic cement –
- Hydraulic engineering –

== I ==
- I-beam –
- Imposed load –
- Infill wall –
- Inflatable space structures –
- Influence line –
- Insulating concrete form –
- International Structural Engineering and Construction Society –
- International System of Units –
- Interval estimation –
- Intrados –
- Iron –
- Interstory drift –

== J ==
- Jack rafter –
- Jackscrew –
- Jetty –
- Joinery –
- Jointing –
- Joist –

== K ==
- Kee Klamp –
- Kentledge –
- Keystone –
- King post –
- King post truss –

== L ==
- Lally column – is a round thin-walled structural steel column oriented vertically to provide support to beams or timbers stretching over long spans. The steel shell of a Lally column is filled with concrete.
- Lightening holes –
- Limit load (physics) –
- Limit state design –
- Linear elasticity –
- Lintel –
- Live load –
- Load bearing –
- Load-bearing wall –

== M ==
- Mass balance –
- Mass density –
- Material properties –
- Materials science –
- Metal alloy –
- Metallic bond –
- Middle-third rule –
- Midhinge –
- Modified compression field theory –
- Modulus of elasticity –
- Moment redistribution –
- Monocoque –
- Multidisciplinary design optimization –
- Multi-function structure –

== N ==
- Non-hydraulic cement –

== O ==
- Offshore construction – is the installation of structures and facilities in a marine environment, usually for the production and transmission of electricity, oil, gas and other resources. It is also called maritime engineering.
- Open web steel joist –
- Oriented strand board –
- Ortman key –
- Overhang –

== P ==
- Panel building –
- Permissible stress design –
- Pile cap –
- Pile splice –
- Plastic hinge –
- Plasticity –
- Plate (structure) –
- Ply (layer) –
- Post (structural) –
- Pre-engineered building –
- Prestressed concrete –
- Prestressed structure –
- Progressive collapse –
- Pyroshock –

== Q ==
- Queen post –

== R ==
- Rafter – is one of a series of sloped structural members that extend from the ridge or hip to the wall plate, downslope perimeter or eave, and that are designed to support the roof deck and its associated loads. A pair of rafters is called a couple. In home construction, rafters are normally made of wood. Exposed rafters are a feature of some traditional roof styles.
- Rain gutter –
- Reinforced concrete –
- Reliability engineering –
- Rigid body –
- Rolled steel joist –
- Roof –
- Rubble trench foundation –

== S ==
- Sandwich panel –
- Sandwich theory –
- Second fix –
- Seismic analysis –
- Semi-monocoque –
- Settlement (structural) –
- Shallow foundation –
- Shear strength –
- Shear stress –
- Shell –
- Shukhov Rotunda –
- SI units –
- Siphon –
- Skyscraper –
- Softwood –
- Soil structure interaction –
- Solid mechanics –
- Solid solution strengthening –
- Space frame –
- Span (engineering) –
- Specific weight –
- Specified load –
- Spontaneous combustion –
- State of matter –
- Static load testing –
- Statical determinacy –
- Statics –
- Statnamic load test –
- Stave (wood) –
- Stewart platform
- Stiffness –
- Storm drain –
- Strain –
- Strain hardening –
- Street gutter –
- Strength of materials –
- Stress –
- Stress–strain analysis –
- Stress–strain curve –
- Stressed skin –
- Structural analysis –
- Structural channel –
- Structural engineer –
- Structural engineering –
- Structural engineering software –
- Structural engineering theory –
- Structural fracture mechanics –
- Structural health monitoring –
- Structural insulated panel –
- Structural integrity and failure –
- Structural loads – or actions, are forces, deformations, or accelerations applied to structure components. Loads cause stresses, deformations, and displacements in structures. Assessment of their effects is carried out by the methods of structural analysis. Excess load or overloading may cause structural failure, and hence such possibility should be either considered in the design or strictly controlled. Mechanical structures, such as aircraft, satellites, rockets, space stations, ships, and submarines, have their own particular structural loads and actions. Engineers often evaluate structural loads based upon published regulations, contracts, or specifications. Accepted technical standards are used for acceptance testing and inspection.
- Structural material –
- Structural mechanics –
- Structural pipe fitting –
- Structural robustness –
- Structural steel –
- Structural steel design –
- Structural system –
- Strut channel –
- Subbasement –
- Subframe –
- Sublimation –
- Subsumption architecture –
- Surface tension –
- Superhard material –
- Surveying –
- Suspension bridge – is a type of bridge in which the deck (the load-bearing portion) is hung below suspension cables on vertical suspenders.

== T ==
- T-beam –
- Tainter gate –
- Technical standard –
- Tensile force –
- Tensile modulus –
- Tensile strength –
- Tensile structure –
- Tensile testing –
- Tension member –
- Thin-shell structure –
- Tie (cavity wall) –
- Timber framing –
- Topology optimization –
- Torque –
- Torsion –
- Torsional vibration –
- Toughness –
- Transient load –
- Trimmer –
- Tripod (foundation) –
- Truss –
- Truss connector plate –
- Twin bridges –

== U ==
- Ultimate tensile strength –
- Universal beam –
- Universal column –

== V ==
- Valve –
- Vibration –
- Voussoir –

== W ==
- W-beam –
- Weld access hole –
- Windpost –
- Wood preservation –
- Woodworking joints –

== X ==
- X-bracing –

== Y ==
- Yield –
- Young's modulus –

== Z ==
- Zero Defects –

== See also ==
- Civil engineering
- Engineering
- National Council of Examiners for Engineering and Surveying
- Fundamentals of Engineering Examination
- Principles and Practice of Engineering Examination
- Graduate Aptitude Test in Engineering
- Glossary of aerospace engineering
- Glossary of civil engineering
- Glossary of electrical and electronics engineering
- Glossary of mechanical engineering
- Glossary of architecture
- Glossary of areas of mathematics
- Glossary of engineering
- Glossary of prestressed concrete terms
