= ISEC =

ISEC may refer to:

- Institute for Social and Economic Change in India
- Instituto Superior de Educação e Ciências in Portugal
- Instituto Superior de Engenharia de Coimbra in Portugal
- International Society for Ecology and Culture, a.k.a. Local Futures
- International Space Elevator Consortium
- International Structural Engineering and Construction Society
- Interdisciplinary Science and Engineering Complex, at Northeastern University
- United States Army Information Systems Engineering Command

== See also ==
- CT510, a video game console previously known as the iSec (Sports Entertainment Center)
