= Moment redistribution =

Moment redistribution refers to the behavior of statically indeterminate structures that are not completely elastic, but have some reserve plastic capacity. When one location first yields, further application of load to the structure causes the bending moment to redistribute differently from what a purely elastic analysis would suggest.

When the load is applied to a beam, the beam resists the load first elastically, then elasto-plastically until the full plastic moment is reached at some point. When the maximum moment is reached, a plastic hinge has formed, which for further load increments behaves as a pin joint. Further increment in load does not increase the moment at the points where the plastic hinges are formed. The increased load increases the moment in the less stressed sections of the beam; hence due to this, further plastic hinges are formed. This process of shift of application of moment in the beam is termed as moment redistribution in a beam.
