= Middle Third =

Middle Third may refer to:

- Middle Third (County Tipperary barony), Ireland
- Middle Third (County Waterford barony), Ireland
- Middle-third rule, in structural engineering
