= Ebox =

Ebox, EBox, EBOX or eBox can refer to

- AC Propulsion eBox, a type of automobile
- eBox, the codename of the CT510 video game console by Lenovo
- zentyal (formerly named eBox), a unified network server software distribution
- Mini computer series by DMP Electronics
- EBOX, a Canadian internet service provider
