= Plastic bending =

Behavior of some ductile materials

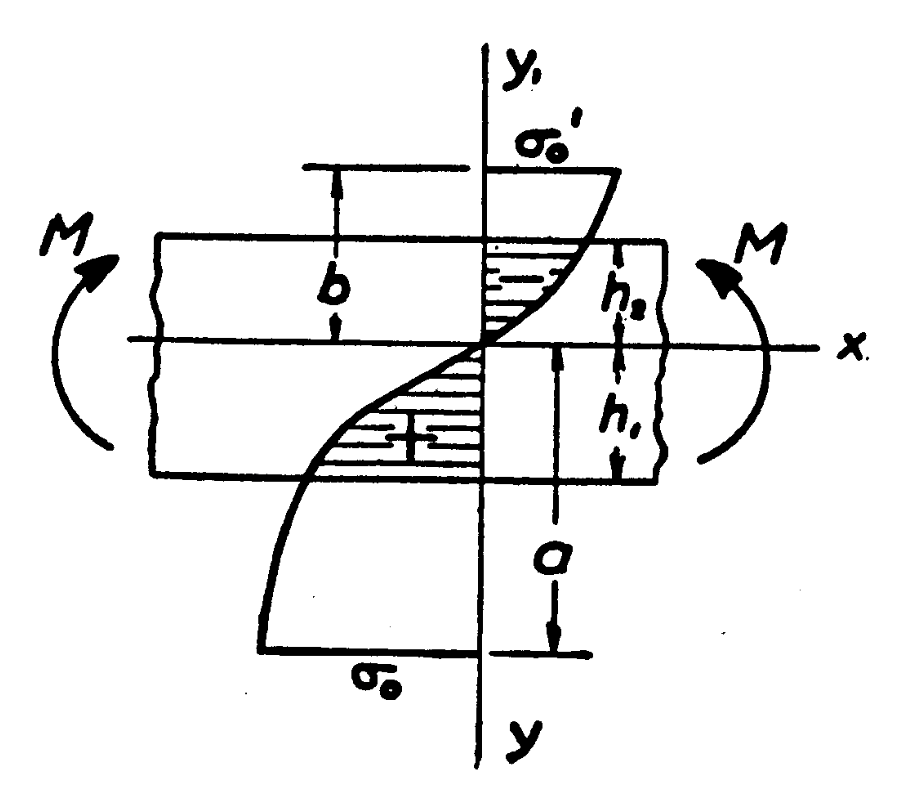
Plastic Bending Stress Distribution

Plastic bending is a nonlinear behavior particular to members made of ductile materials that frequently achieve much greater ultimate bending strength than indicated by a linear elastic bending analysis. In both the plastic and elastic bending analyses of a straight beam, it is assumed that the strain distribution is linear about the neutral axis (plane sections remain plane). In an elastic analysis this assumption leads to a linear stress distribution but in a plastic analysis the resulting stress distribution is nonlinear and is dependent on the beam's material.

The limiting plastic bending strength $M_r$ (see Plastic moment) can generally be thought of as an upper limit to a beam's load–carrying capability as it only represents the strength at a particular cross–section and not the load–carrying capability of the overall beam. A beam may fail due to global or local instability before $M_r$ is reached at any point on its length. Therefore, beams should also be checked for local buckling, local crippling, and global lateral–torsional buckling modes of failure.

Note that the deflections necessary to develop the stresses indicated in a plastic analysis are generally excessive, frequently to the point of incompatibility with the function of the structure. Therefore, separate analysis may be required to ensure design deflection limits are not exceeded. Also, since working materials into the plastic range can lead to permanent deformation of the structure, additional analyses may be required at limit load to ensure no detrimental permanent deformations occur. The large deflections and stiffness changes usually associated with plastic bending can significantly change the internal load distribution, particularly in statically indeterminate beams. The internal load distribution associated with the deformed shape and stiffness should be used for calculations.

Plastic bending begins when an applied moment causes the outside fibers of a cross-section to exceed the material's yield strength. Loaded only by a moment, the peak bending stresses occurs at the outside fibers of a cross-section. The cross-section will not yield linearly through the section. Rather, outside regions will yield first, redistributing stress and delaying failure beyond what would be predicted by elastic analytical methods. The stress distribution from the neutral axis is the same as the shape of the stress-strain curve of the material (this assumes a non-composite cross-section). After a cross-section reaches a sufficiently high condition of plastic bending, it acts as a Plastic hinge.

Elementary Elastic Bending theory requires that the bending stress varies linearly with distance from the neutral axis, but plastic bending shows a more accurate and complex stress distribution. The yielded areas of the cross-section will vary somewhere between the yield and ultimate strength of the material. In the elastic region of the cross-section, the stress distribution varies linearly from the neutral axis to the beginning of the yielded area. Predicted failure occurs when the stress distribution approximates the material's stress-strain curve. The largest value being that of the ultimate strength. Not every area of the cross-section will have exceeded the yield strength.

As in the basic Elastic Bending theory, the moment at any section is equal to an area integral of bending stress across the cross-section. From this and the above additional assumptions, predictions of deflections and failure strength are made.

Plastic theory was validated around 1908 by C. v. Bach.

== See also ==
- Strength of materials
- Bending
- Plastic moment
- Plastic hinge
- Stephen Timoshenko
