= Kee Klamp =

Type of pipe fitting

Key Klamp
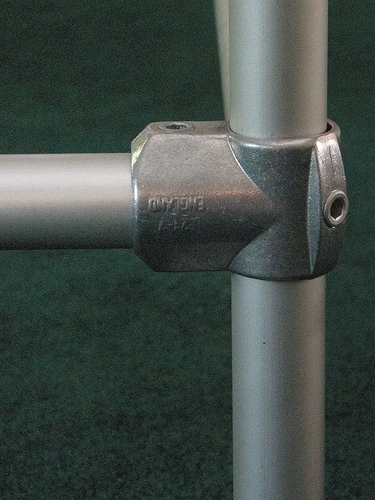
- Basic fitting
- Inventor: George H. Gascoigne and colleagues
- Inception: 1934
- Manufacturer: Gascoignes (Reading) Ltd.
- Available: Available

A Key Klamp is a structural pipe fitting commonly used in the construction of handrails and barriers. Fabricated installations comprise the fittings and separate tubing components, which can be sized on site.

The system was devised in 1934 and is made by a subsidiary of KIG Holdings. The fittings are mostly supplied to third parties for sale to fabricators, with a small proportion of sales being made internally to specialist divisions of the company.

== History ==
The system was developed in 1934 by George H. Gascoigne and his colleagues in Reading, England for making cows' milking stalls. It was advertised to industrial chemists in 1944, and used for storage systems in factories in the 1960s. By 1980 it was available in Canada, as noted by the Canadian Institute of Mining and Metallurgy

== Components ==
The system comprises unthreaded cast iron or aluminium structural tubing and slip-on structural pipe fittings. The galvanized malleable fittings provide resistance to corrosion and are secured to the tubes using set screws by use of a hex key.

Some cutting or bending of the tubes may be required while installing the system, according to site-specific circumstances. Skilled labourers such as welders are not required, but the material costs are higher for the Key Klamp system. A contractor at the Long Island Rail Road described the system in 2007 as being "very simple to install".

== Usage ==
Also cow stalls, bank operated yard yokes, calf penning, bull corner yokes and bull pen railing.

— Leaflet for Key Klamp cattle control system, mid-1950s

Example uses of various derived systems are in guard rails and market stalls. More unusual uses have been seen in home shelving, kite buggying and the Rover chair. Parkour and Ninja Warrior training facilities have also benefited from the reliable and quick to set up Structural Pipe Fittings.

In 2003, the company and a former competitor stated that such fittings were not being used in some countries in Europe, in favour of welding. This was due to lower labour costs. For uncomplicated installations, welding may be a cheaper solution than Key Klamp, depending upon usage.

== Market dominance ==
In 2003, the system dominated the UK and EU markets, with a share of 70–80 per cent. (The fittings market was worth £5–8 million in the UK in 2003.) The premium branding the product is said to hold is due to KIG offering incremental services. Some customers inherently prefer using such fittings, while others prefer welding. The choice of system is often made during initial design of an installation.

The system is marketed for specific uses under various names, including a low-cost brand called Tubeclamp and a high-end brand called Interclamp. Specialist divisions of the company exist which fabricate finished structures, although such internal sales of the fittings constitute only a fraction of total fittings sales.

Between 1998 and 2003, volumes of Key Klamp sales increased. The value of total annual sales remained static throughout this period, associated with an overall price reduction of 20–30 per cent. During this period, the price reduction of a complete system including the tube components was 5–10 per cent.

A business acquisition by KIG of no frills competitor FastMat (a subsidiary of Access Technologies) in 2003 led to a report being filed with the UK's Secretary of State for Trade and Industry under the Fair Trading Act 1973. The report concluded that the merger should not be referred to the Competition Commission due to the relatively inexpensive cost of entry to the market by others. Most suppliers of competing products to the UK import their fittings from low-cost Far East contract manufacturers.
