= Victoria Swing Bridge =

Road bridge in Edinburgh, Scotland

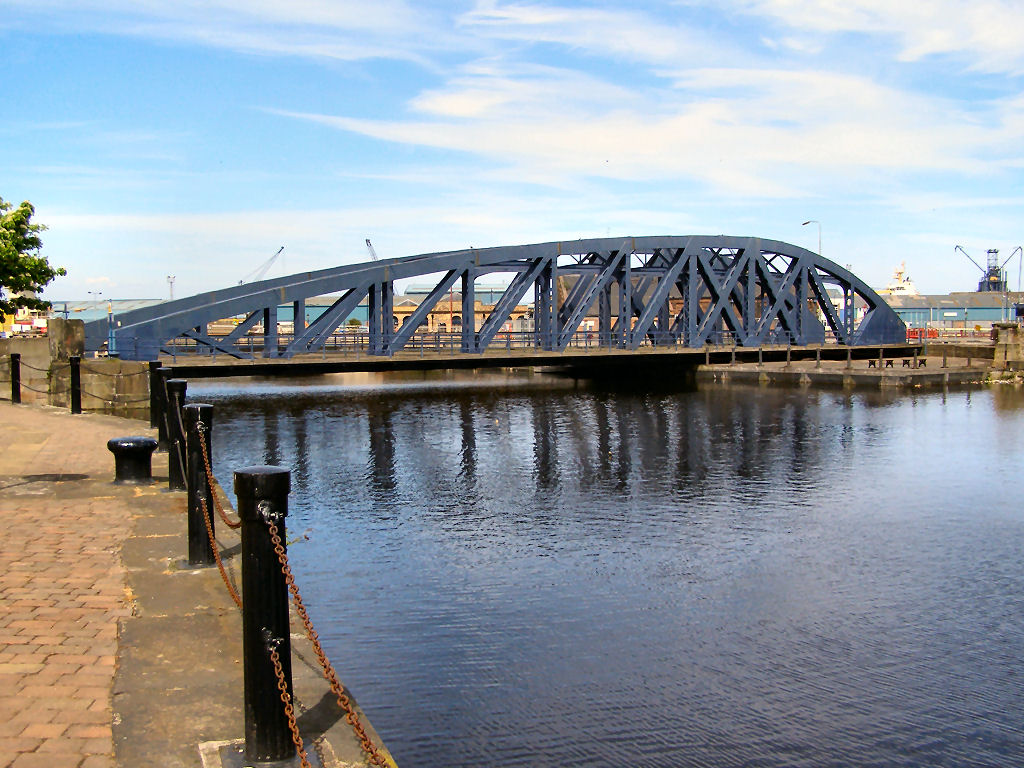
- Coordinates: 55.9787251°N 3.1699057°W
- Crosses: Water of Leith
- Locale: Edinburgh

Characteristics
- Material: Wrought iron
- Total length: 212 feet (65 m)
- Width: 24 feet (7.3 m)
- Longest span: 120 feet (37 m)

History
- Designer: Rendel and Robertson
- Construction start: 1871
- Construction end: 1874
- Construction cost: £30,000

Listed Building – Category A
- Official name: Victoria Swing Bridge, Leith Docks
- Designated: 12 December 1974
- Reference no.: LB27644

Location
- Interactive map of Victoria Swing Bridge

The Victoria Swing Bridge is a swing bridge in Leith docks, Edinburgh, Scotland, which carried a dock road (and previously twin railway lines) across the Water of Leith at a point where it is canalised as the Inner Harbour. It was built to improve passage between the west and east sides of the Port of Leith. The bridge is no longer operational and is now just a footpath.

== History ==
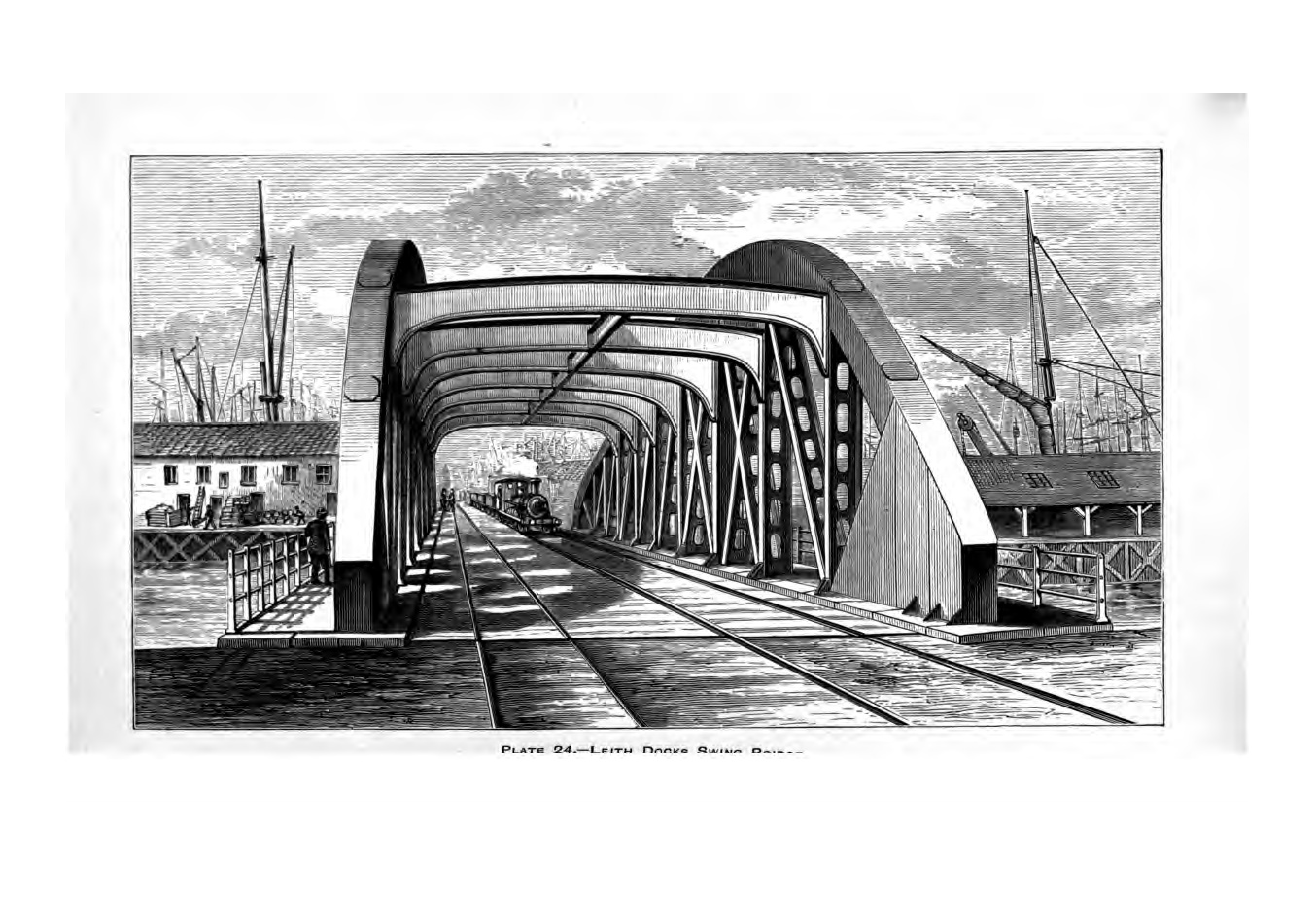
Engraving of the bridge carrying a train from around 1879

The bridge was built between 1871 and 1874 to service the new docks. It was engineered by Rendel and Robertson, with J. H. Bostock as resident engineer. McDonald & Grant were contractors for the foundations, and the bridge was built by the Skerne Iron Works. The works cost around £30,000.

Until the completion of the Kincardine Bridge, also in Scotland, in 1936, it is thought to have been the longest clear swing bridge span in Britain (The Swing Bridge, River Tyne, completed two years after the Victoria Bridge, has a longer deck span).

In 1974, the bridge was designated a Category A listed building by Historic Environment Scotland (HES).

Despite some renovation of the bridge that was completed in 2000, HES put the structure on the Buildings at Risk Register in 2020 with a risk category of "Moderate". This followed reports of the poor condition of the deck, with timber rotting in places and vegetation taking hold.

In 2021, Forth Ports was granted listed building consent for a full refurbishment programme, the work to include renovation of the two walkways, re-decking of the carriageway, replacement of the decked turning circle areas and repainting of the metalwork. The project would be financed by a "private six-figure investment". The refurbishment was completed and the bridge officially reopened in June 2024.

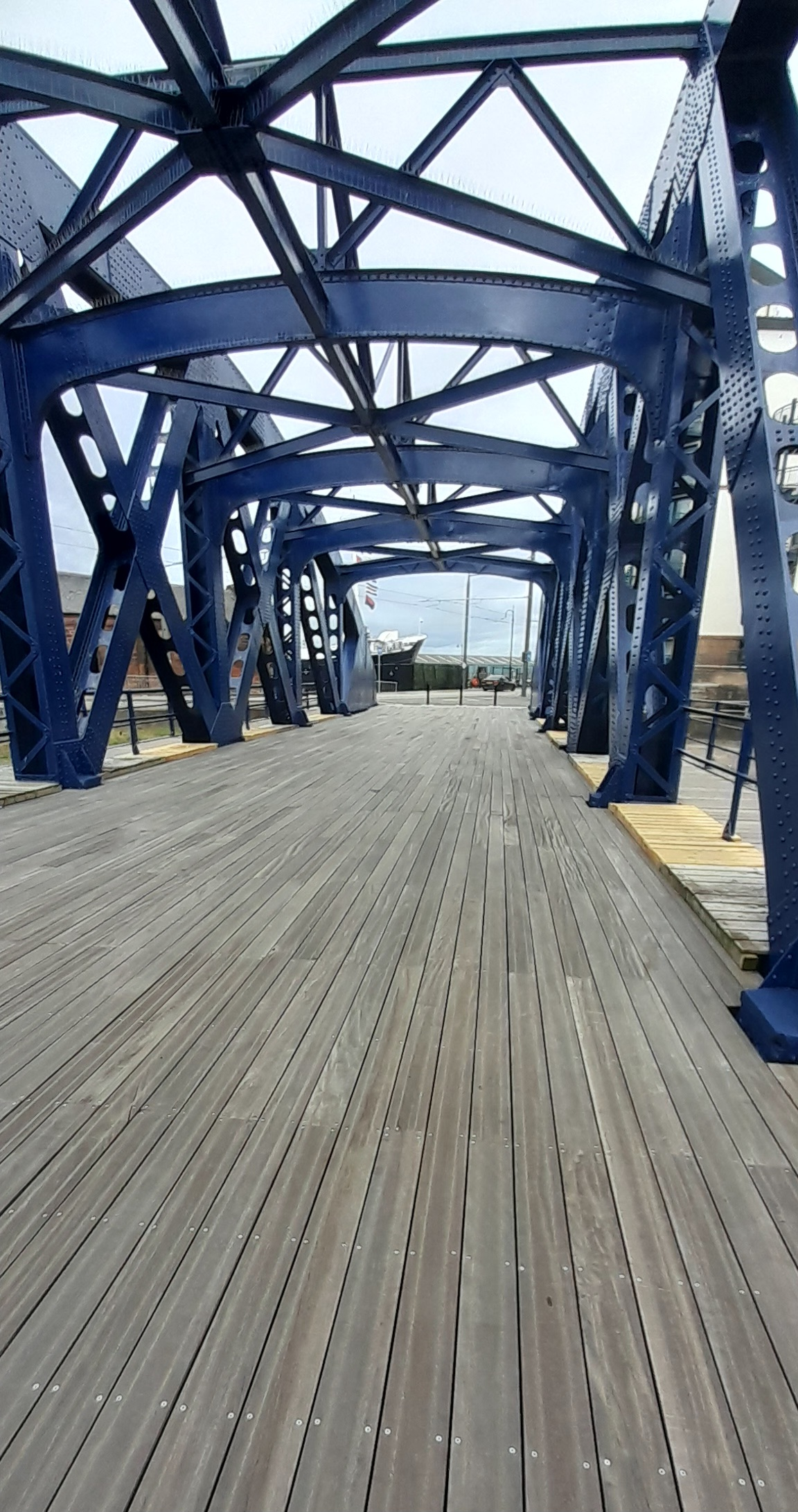
Completed refurbishment, 2024

== Design ==
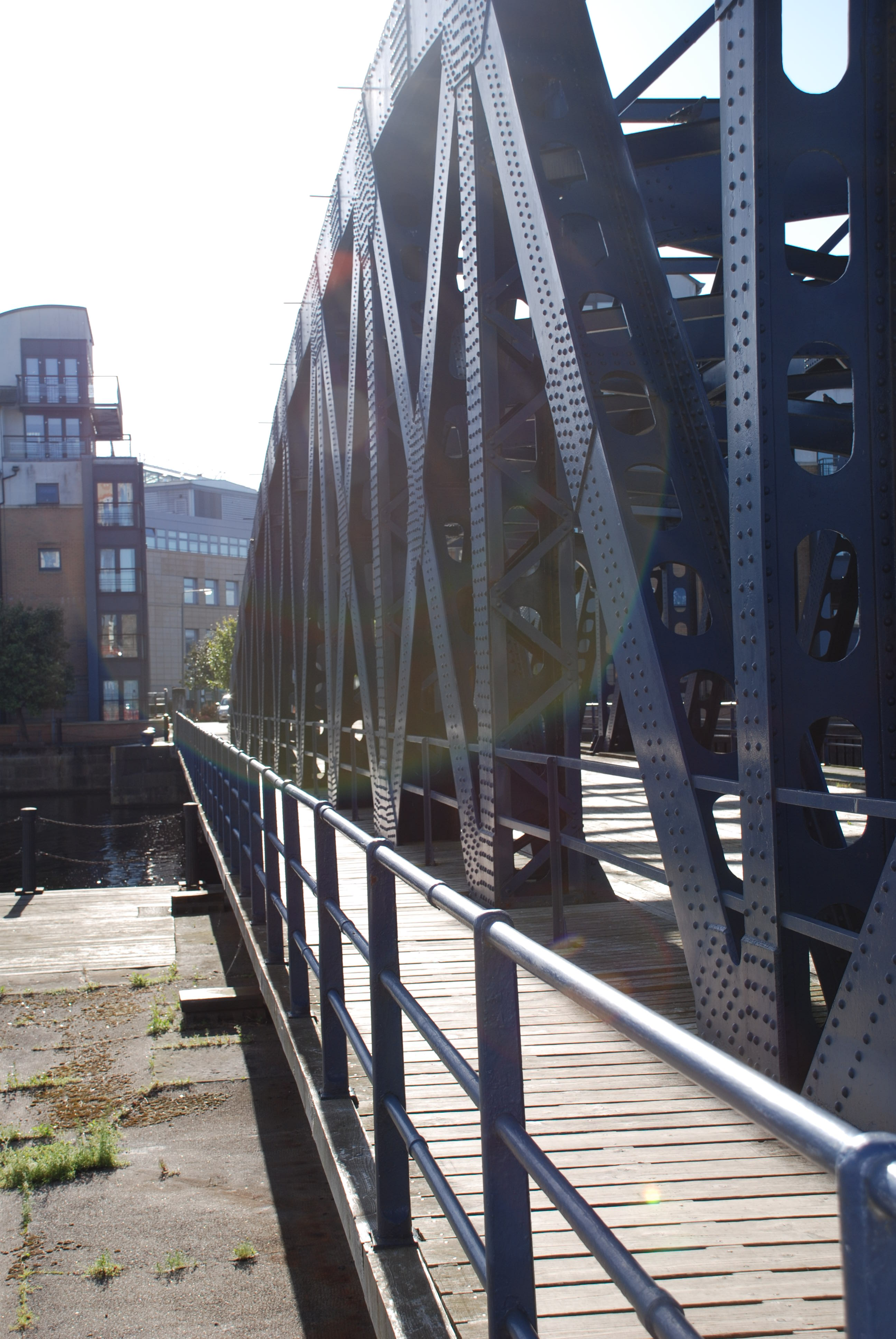
The footpath on the north side of the bridge

It was 212 feet (65 m) long in total, with a clear span of 120 feet (37 m), and a roadway width of 24 feet (7.3 m). The bridge was constructed from wrought iron, and weighed 620 tonnes (610 long tons; 680 short tons), including 60 tonnes (59 long tons; 66 short tons) of timber decking and 240 tonnes (240 long tons; 260 short tons) of kentledge counterweight. The bridge carried two tracks of a dock railway and a road, and there are footpaths on either side outside the truss structure. The tracks and roadway have now been removed, and the bridge has a wooden deck.

The bridge was powered hydraulically by a power station just to the north. It swung to the north, and the space afforded for the counterbalance can still be seen.

It has been succeeded by a new fixed bridge further downstream, which carries a road known as Ocean Drive, and subsequently the Edinburgh Trams lines.

== See also ==
- List of bridges in Scotland
