= Hollow structural section =

Type of metal profile

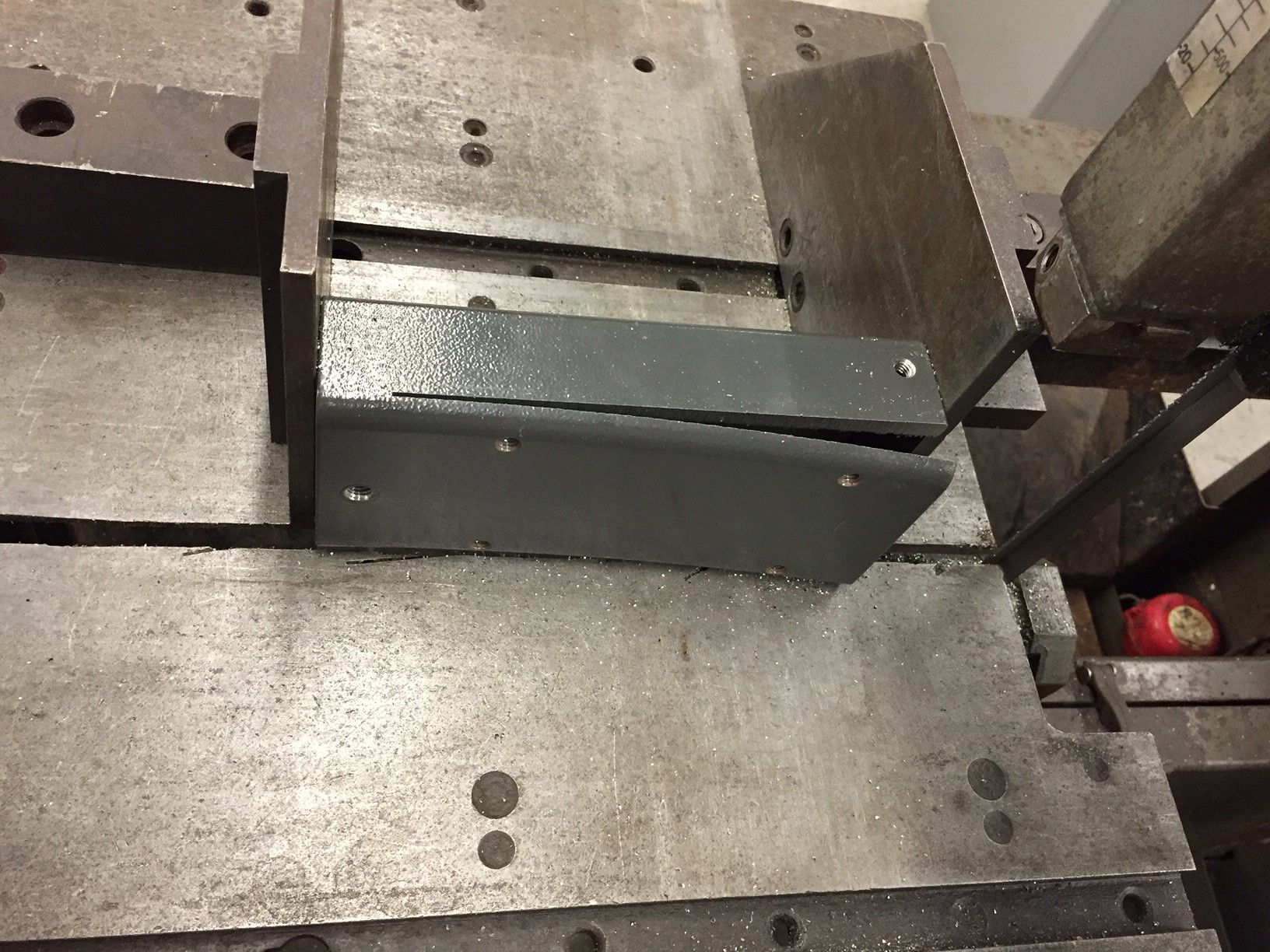
A hot-rolled HSS-box section cut open with a bandsaw, demonstrating residual stress

A hollow structural section (HSS) is a type of metal profile with a hollow cross section. These profiles can be circular, square, or rectangular sections, although other shapes such as elliptical are also available.

In Europe, or other countries which follow EN 10210 or EN 10219 standards, the term HSS is not used. Rather, the three basic shapes are referenced as CHS, SHS, and RHS, being circular, square, and rectangular hollow sections. As an example, CHS 200 x 10 would be a Circular Hollow Section with an outer diameter of 200 mm and a wall thickness of 10 mm.

== Comparison with other products ==
HSS is sometimes mistakenly referenced as hollow structural steel. Rectangular and square HSS are also commonly called tube steel or box section. Circular HSS are sometimes mistakenly called steel pipe, although true steel pipe is actually dimensioned and classed differently from HSS. (HSS dimensions are based on exterior dimensions of the profile; pipes are also manufactured to an exterior tolerance, albeit to a different standard.) The corners of HSS are heavily rounded, having a radius which is approximately twice the wall thickness. The wall thickness is uniform around the section.

== Use in structures ==
HSS, especially rectangular sections, are commonly used in welded steel frames where members experience loading in multiple directions. Square and circular HSS have very efficient shapes for this multiple-axis loading as they have uniform geometry along two or more cross-sectional axes, and thus uniform strength characteristics. This makes them good choices for columns. They also have excellent resistance to torsion.

HSS can also be used as beams, although wide flange or I-beam shapes are in many cases a more efficient structural shape for this application. However, the HSS has superior resistance to lateral torsional buckling.

The flat square surfaces of rectangular HSS can ease construction, and they are sometimes preferred for architectural aesthetics in exposed structures, although elliptical HSS are becoming more popular in exposed structures for the same aesthetic reasons.

Today, HSS is commonly available in mild steel, A500 grade C. Other steel grades available for HSS are A847 (weathering steel), A1065 (large sections up to 50 inch sq made with SAW process), and recently approved A1085 (higher strength, tighter tolerances than A500). In Europe, the typical S235 steel is used.

== Manufacture ==
Square HSS is made the same way as pipe. During the manufacturing process flat steel plate is gradually changed in shape to become round where the edges are presented ready to weld. The edges are then welded together to form the mother tube. During the manufacturing process the mother tube goes through a series of shaping stands which form the round HSS (mother tube) into the final square or rectangular shape. Most American manufacturers adhere to the ASTM A500 or newly adopted ASTM A1085 standards, while Canadian manufacturers follow both ASTM A500 and CSA G40.21. European hollow sections are generally in accordance with the EN 10210 standard.

== Filled HSS ==
HSS is often filled with concrete to improve the fire resistance rating and robustness. When this is done, the product is referred to as a Lally column after its inventor John Lally of Waltham, Massachusetts. (The pronunciation is often corrupted to lolly column.) For example, barriers around parking areas (bollards) made of HSS are often filled to at least bumper height with concrete. This is an inexpensive (when replacement costs are factored in) way of adding compressive strength to the bollard, which can help prevent unsightly local denting, though it does not generally significantly increase the overall structural properties.

== See also ==
- Hollow-core slab
- Honeycomb structure
- Lightening holes
- Profile (engineering)
- Structural pipe fitting
- Structural steel
