= High strain dynamic testing =

High strain dynamic testing is a method of testing deep foundations to obtain information about their capacity and integrity, and in some cases, to monitor their installation. It is codified by ASTM D4945-12 - Standard Test Method for High-Strain Dynamic Testing of Piles.

High strain dynamic testing is called dynamic pile monitoring when it is applied during pile driving and dynamic load testing when it is applied following pile installation, regardless of the installation method.

The origins of these testing methods date to research conducted in the 1960s and 1970s at what is now known as Case Western Reserve University, with funding of the Ohio Department of Transportation. The 1972 paper Soil Resistance Predictions from Pile Dynamics, by Rausche, F., Moses, F., Goble, G. G., published by the Journal of the Soil Mechanics and Foundations Division, American Society of Civil Engineers transformed the academic research into a process embraced by the engineering community.

High strain dynamic testing consists of estimating soil resistance and its distribution from force and velocity measurements obtained near the top of a foundation impacted by a hammer or drop weight. The impact produces a compressive wave that travels down the shaft of the foundation.

A pair of strain transducers obtains the signals necessary to compute force, while measurements from a pair of accelerometers are integrated to yield velocity. These sensors are connected to an instrument (such as a Pile Driving Analyzer), that records, processes and displays data and results.

As long as the wave travels in one direction and the material is behaving elastically, force and velocity are proportional and related by the expression F = Zv, where:

- Z = EA/c is the pile impedance
- E is the pile material modulus of elasticity
- A is the cross sectional area of the pile
- c is the material wave speed at which the wave front travels

The wave assumes an opposite direction (a reflection) when it encounters soil resistance forces along the shaft or at the toe. These reflections travel upward along the shaft and arrive at the pile top at times that are related to their location along the shaft. The sensors near the pile top take measurements that make it possible to estimate soil resistance and its distribution.

The data obtained in this fashion permits the computation of total soil resistance, which includes both static and viscous components. The dynamic component is computed as the product of the pile velocity times the damping factor (a soil parameter related to soil grain size). The static component is the total soil resistance minus the dynamic component.

Signal matching analysis is a further step in analyzing the collected data, providing more accurate static capacity and resistance distribution estimates, pile integrity assessment, and stress distribution along the shaft.

Dynamic pile monitoring takes advantage of the fact that, for driven piles, it is possible to compute the energy delivered to the pile, compression stresses at the pile top and toe and tension stresses along the shaft.

== See also ==
- Low strain dynamic testing
