= Edmund key =

The Edmund key is a variant of the Ortman Key. It is a coupling device used to secure two adjacent cylindrical segments of a pressure vessel common in tactical rocket motors. The key is made of an elongated rectangular metal bar stock, such as steel, and is inserted into juxtaposed annular grooves around the circumference of the mating parts. An Edmund key also provides a feature at the end of the key to allow the key to be extracted from the groove for disassembly.

== Sources ==
- Patent number: 6729004 Nov 13, 2002
