= Static load testing =

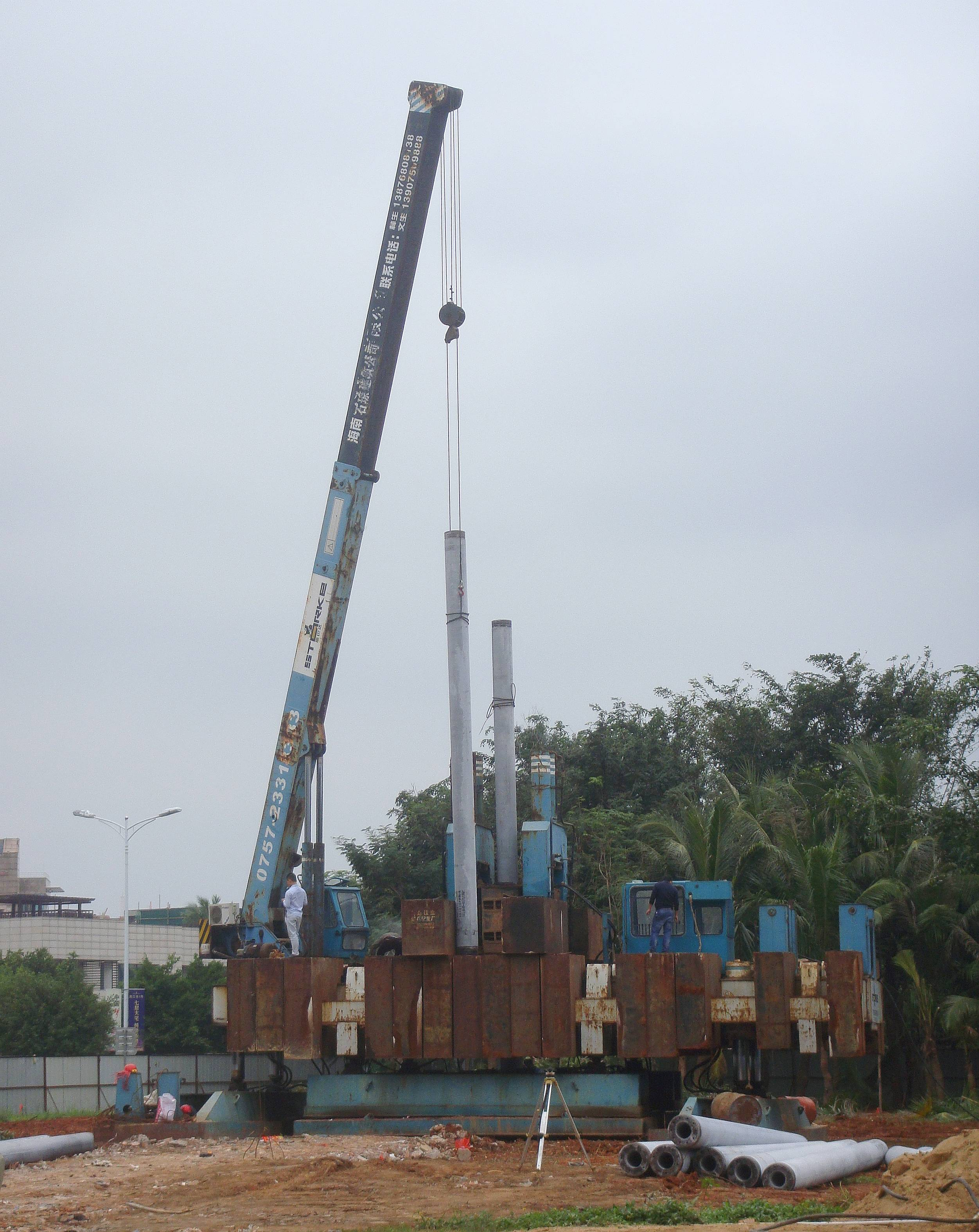
Kentledge load testing in Haikou, Hainan, China

Static load testing is an in situ type of load testing used in geotechnical investigation to determine the bearing capacity of deep foundations prior to the construction of a building. It differs from the statnamic load test and dynamic load testing in that the pressure applied to the pile is slower. Static load testings are performed in order to measure a design's axial tension or axial compression. It can also be used to measure its deflected shape under lateral load.

== Kentledge load testing method ==
Kentledge refers to iron weights used as permanent ship ballast, or iron or concrete weights used in load testing. This method involves the construction of a platform upon which massive weights are placed. These weights bear down on the pile putting it under load. Gauges measure resistance, movement of the pile, and other readings to determine the properties of the ground.

== Bi-Directional pile load testing method ==
Bi-Directional Static Load Test is a steadfast Maintained Load Test option for both large and small diameter piles that is widely used in the market. The main difference between a top-loaded maintained load test and a Bi-Directional is the location of the jack. One of the types of bi-directional method is YJACK method.

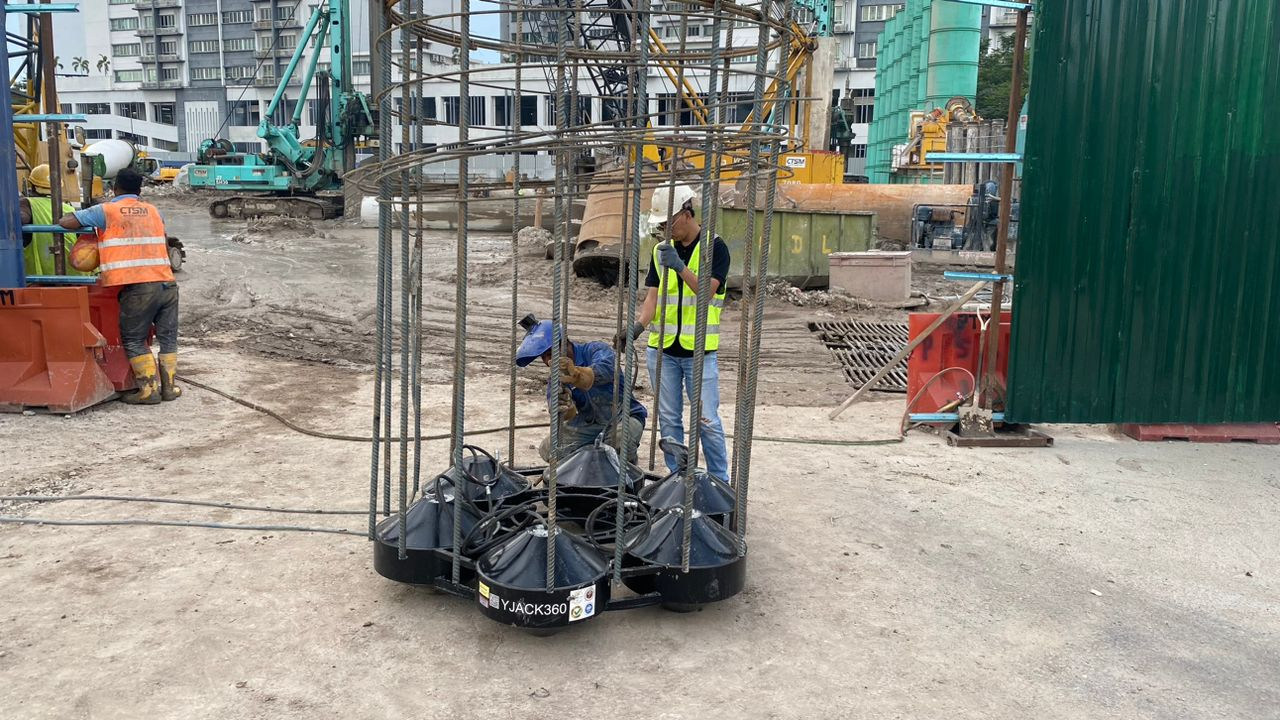
One of the bi-directional testing using YJACK360 method at Kuala Lumpur, Malaysia.

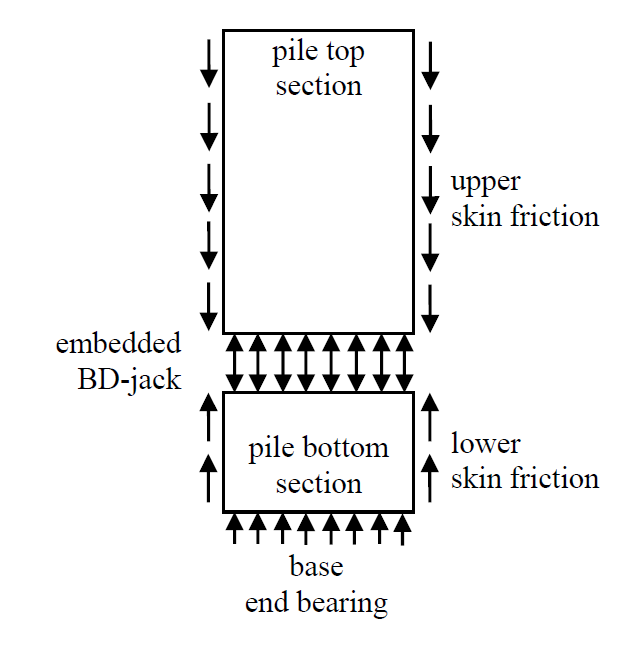
BD mechanism

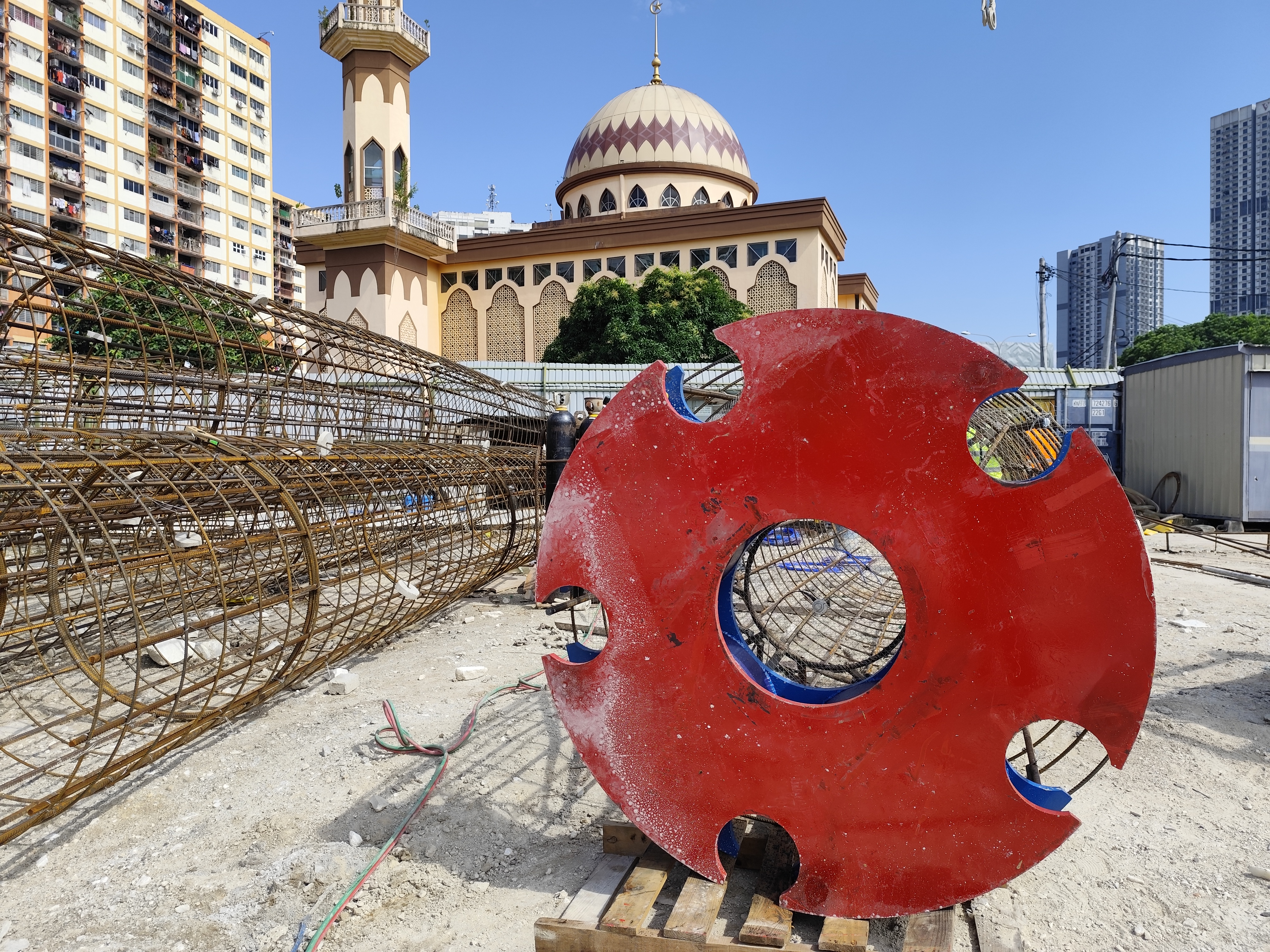
OJACK360 Bi-Directional Pile Load Test
