= Pile integrity test =

Method to assess condition of piles

A pile integrity test (also known as low-strain dynamic test, sonic echo test, and low-strain integrity test) is one of the methods for assessing the condition of piles or shafts. It is cost-effective and not very time-consuming.

Pile integrity testing using low-strain tests such as the TDR (Transient Dynamic Response) method, is a rapid way of assessing the continuity and integrity of concrete piled foundations.

== Overview ==
A pile is a slender element cast in the ground or driven into it. Since pile construction as well as the final product are mostly invisible, engineers have often questioned their integrity, i.e. their compliance with project drawings and specifications. In fact, experience has shown that in piles, of all kinds flaws may occur. The purpose of integrity testing is to discover such flaws before they can cause any damage.

== Measures ==
The test measures:

- pile head stiffness
- pile length, or depth to anomalies
- pile shaft mobility, which is dependent on pile section and concrete properties

The software also produces computer simulations and impedance profiles of the test result, to analyse in detail any intermediate pile shaft responses. The TDR test requires minimal of preparation and is able to find defects corresponding to cracks, reductions in section and zones of poor quality concrete

The test is based on wave propagation theory. The name "low-strain dynamic test" stems from the fact that when a light impact is applied to a pile it produces a low strain. The impact produces a compression wave that travels down the pile at a constant wave speed (similarly to what happens in high strain dynamic testing). Changes in cross sectional area - such as a reduction in diameter - or material - such as a void in concrete - produce wave reflections.

This procedure is performed with a hand held hammer to generate an impact, an accelerometer or geophone placed on top of the pile to be tested to measure the response to the hammer impact, and a data acquisition and interpretation electronic instrument.

== Performance ==
The test works well in concrete or timber foundations that are not excessively slender. Usually the method is applied to recently constructed piles that are not yet connected to a structure. However, this method is also used to test the integrity and to determine the length of piles embedded in structures.

This method is covered under ASTM D5882-16 - Standard Test Method for Low Strain Integrity Testing of Piles.

== Direct methods ==
Historically, pile integrity was investigated by direct methods. These included external methods such as excavation around the pile and internal or intrusive methods, such as core-drilling . While excavation may be effective in exposing flaws in the outer part of the pile, it is usually limited to a depth of a few meters. Core drilling, on the other hand, can be carried out to a large depth provides full information, but only for a very small fraction of the pile volume.

== Indirect methods ==
Indirect methods, or imaging, were first developed in the early 1970s. These include three distinct methods:

- Nuclear radiation, or gamma-gamma method
- Short wave (ultrasonic) acoustic method
- Long wave (sonic) acoustic method
