= Jack post =

Steel support post used in construction

A jack post (screw jack, telepost, adjustable steel column) is a steel post used in the construction trades for temporary support of loads such as ceilings, walls, and concrete formwork, and as shoring in trenches. They are designed to be able to mechanically telescope to about twice the distance between their pre-drilled adjustment holes. Most examples use removable pins for coarse adjustment and a jack screw for fine adjustments, but many variations exist.

== Terminology ==
Although jack posts are widely standardized, their terminology is not. "Jack post" is just one of many describing the same system: others include any assortment of "adjustable", "steel", "screw", "jack", and "shoring" with "post", "column", "jack", and "prop", depending on region, trade, and precise construction. The "jack" refers to examples with a jack screw to adjust the precise length of the post. They are also known by any number of proprietary names, notably "Acrow prop" in the U.K., after the Acrow Group that introduced them in the UK.

== Description ==
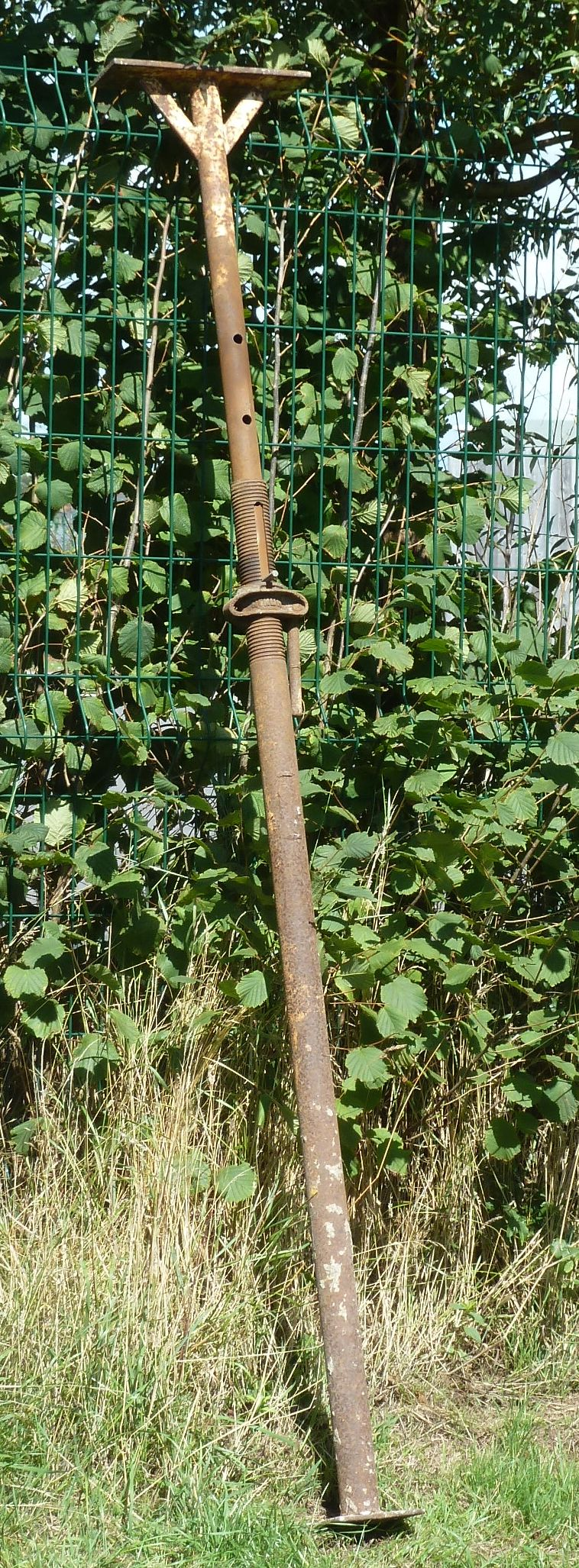
An Acrow prop, a common form of jack support in the U.K.

Jack posts are telescopic tubular steel props consisting of two primary parts, both tubular: the main body of the post, and the threaded jack screw or other adjustable fitting on one or both ends. Both ends are normally fitted with flat metal plates on the end, increasing their bearing surface. A recent improvement to Acrow props was to shape this baseplate with notches, allowing pallet loads of horizontal props to be stacked neatly, rather than randomly piled.

Gross adjustment for length is first made by sliding the two sections within each other until they almost fill the gap, inserting a pin through regularly-spaced pre-drilled circular holes to lock them together, then adjusting the screw to the degree of tightness desired. Other designs used two threaded pipes instead of sliding sections, ratechetting or clamping sections, or other similar concepts to lock the system at a specific length.

Jack posts are mostly used for shoring as temporary supports during construction, repair, or alteration work, and should not be confused with scaffolding that provides platforms for workers and materials, nor Lally columns placed as permanent structural supports.

== British Standard ==
Metal props, their size, strength and construction, are now described by a British Standard BS4074. A similar lightweight European prop design exists, these have a maximum capacity of only 5 kilonewtons (1,100 lb_{f}).

Props are made in a range of five BS standard sizes:

- size 0 from 3.5 feet (1.1 m) to 6 feet (1.8 m),
- size 1 from 5.75 feet (1.75 m) to 10.25 feet (3.12 m),
- size 2 from 6.5 feet (2.0 m) to 11 feet (3.4 m),
- size 3 from 8 feet (2.4 m) to 13 feet (4.0 m),
- size 4 from 10.5 feet (3.2 m) to 16 feet (4.9 m).

The safe load for each prop depends upon the size and extension of the prop. Size 1, 2 and 3 props can take about 34 kN unextended, dropping progressively to less than half of that when fully extended. Size 0 props can take at least 23 kN, whereas size 4 props at most 20 kN dropping to 7 kN at their maximum extension. Props must be loaded concentrically, i.e. vertically for simple weights, to within 25mm.

== See also ==
- Lally column
