= First fix and second fix =

Construction industry terms in the UK and Ireland

First fix and second fix are terms used in the UK and Irish housebuilding and commercial building construction industry.

First fix comprises all the work needed to take a building from foundation to putting plaster on the internal walls. This includes constructing walls, floors and ceilings, and inserting cables for electrical supply and pipes for water supply.

Some argue that First Fix starts after the shell of the building is complete, and ends when the walls are plastered. Here is a list, in no particular order, of the elements of First Fix.

- Drain runs: must be downhill and straight
- Spare conduits: draw strings
- Soil pipes
- Copper pipes
- MVHR (mechanical heat recovery ventilation runs)
- Push-fit or other plastic piping
- Electrical back boxes
- Electricity cable runs
- Telephone, data and audiovisual cables
- Socket location
- Security
- Fire alarm
- Normal pipes
- Door bell
- Door frames
- Pocket doorframes
- Stair well: floating / cantilevered?
- Sound insulation
- Plasterboarding

The list is not exhaustive.

Second fix comprises all the work after the plastering of a finished house. Electrical fixtures are connected to the cables, sinks and baths connected to the pipes, and doors fitted into doorframes. Second fix work requires a neater finish than first fix.

The division of work is a convenient description because electricians, plumbers and carpenters will probably have to make two separate visits to one property under construction, at separate times. Project managers can report "first fix complete" or "second fix 50% done" and others can understand.

Some construction companies specialise in first fix work or second fix work, but most do both.

In North America, terms such as roughing in and finishing or rough-in and finish work are often heard, referring to similar concepts. Another related set of terms is outside work and inside work (the building is closed to the weather when the latter occurs). Carpenters speak of rough work and trim work (or framing versus trimming), and other fields have analogues, such as machining (roughing versus finishing cuts) and communications (rough draft versus revised draft).

== Electrical installations and "third fixes" ==
Electrical installations can be further divided into first, second and third fixes:

- First Fix: Positioning and securing of accessory boxes
- Second Fix: Preparation and positioning of cables
- Third Fix: Termination of conductors to accessories and protective devices

As modern society's reliance on technology increases, the need to properly house sensitive electronic equipment becomes a greater concern. The installation of this equipment takes place in the "third fix" segment of a construction project. It is especially important that installation of sensitive electronic equipment be installed only when a construction site is dust-controlled and prepared for what would be considered "dust free" conditions. For example, for the modern computer server room, equipment would be installed only when dust and atmospheric conditions are minimized and controlled. Similar to the atmospheric needs of medical and scientific research laboratories, the production of discrete semiconductor devices and integrated circuits is undertaken in a cleanroom atmosphere where low levels of environmental pollutants such as particulates and airborne microbes are strictly minimised and most preferably eliminated.

The UK national building specifications, British Standard 5295:1989, specifically addresses "clean room" environments serving electronics manufacturers, as well as the pharmaceutical industry (the Pharmaceutical Industry has, for some time, worked to the ISO standard 14644 which is subtly different). Standard 5295:1989 specifically pertains to constructed interior spaces where higher than normal environmental standards must be maintained, in order to control particulate contamination, temperature and humidity. It is only at the third fix stage, when building site conditions are rendered virtually dust free, so as to minimise the introduction, generation and retention of particles which may contaminate equipment serving the electronics and pharmaceuticals manufacturing process, that the build-out of "clean room" spaces can commence.
