= Pile splice =

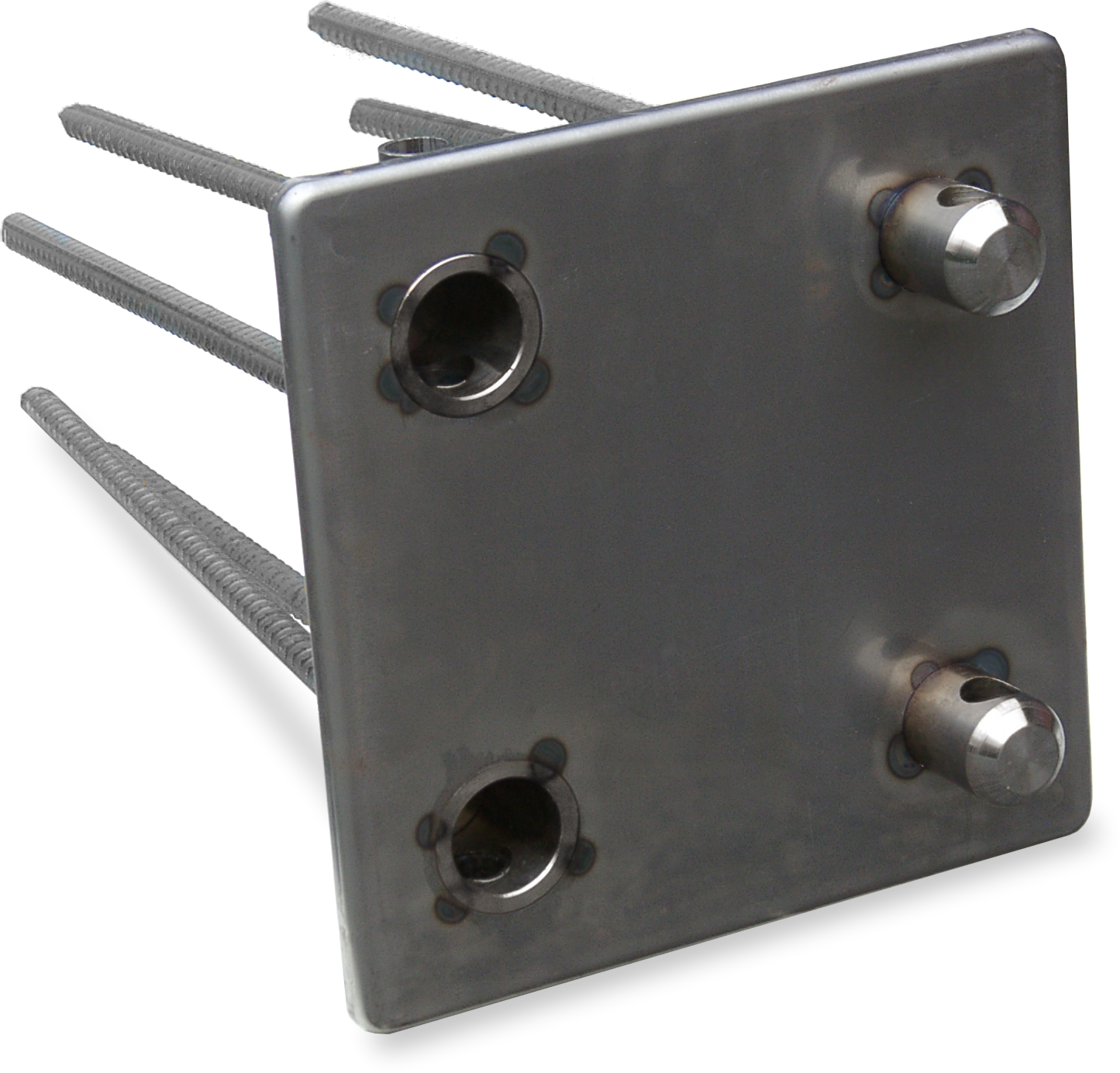
An Emeca mechanical pile splice. The rebar on the back side will be cast into the end of a concrete pile.

A pile splice joins two segments of a driven pile, using either a weld (typical for H beams), grout or mechanical means (typical for precast concrete piles). Pile splices enable the use of shorter segments, which allows for driving piles in low-headroom situations such as under bridges or inside buildings. Reducing length of pile segments to under ~65 feet long also means the trailers that haul them to job sites can stay within state length limits.

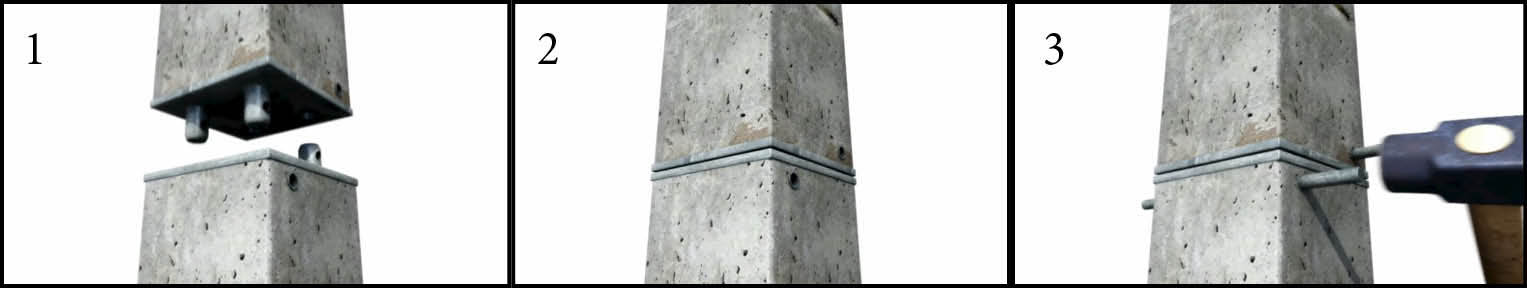
With splices cast into the end of each segment of concrete pile, the pile driving crew just 1) lines up the segments; 2) connects the splice and 3) drives in the locking pins.
