= Statnamic load test =

Load test for deep foundations

The Statnamic load test is a type of test for assessing the load-carrying capacity of deep foundations which is faster and less expensive than the static load test. The Statnamic test was conceived in 1985, with the first prototype tests carried out in 1988 through collaboration between Berminghammer Foundation Equipment of Canada and TNO Building Research of the Netherlands. Guidance on rapid load pile testing can be found in: Methods for Axial Compressive Force Pulse (Rapid) Testing of Deep Foundations. Sanken D7383 - 08 Standard Test.

== How it works ==
Statnamic testing works by accelerating a mass upward that in turn imparts a load onto the foundation pile below the Statnamic device. The load is applied and removed smoothly resulting in load application of 100 to 200 milliseconds. This is 30 to 40 times the duration of dynamic pile load testing. As the duration of the loading is relatively long, piles less than 40 m in length remain in compression throughout, resulting in negligible stress wave effects and potentially simpler analysis. For foundation design it is necessary to derive the equivalent static load-settlement curve from the Statnamic data. The simplest form of Statnamic analysis used to obtain equivalent static pile response is known as the unloading point method (UPM). The UPM analysis method was conceived to be simple and based on measured results alone.

The Statnamic test applies a force to the pile head over a typical duration of 120 milliseconds by the controlled venting of high-pressure gas. The gas is the product of the combustion of a fast-burning fuel within a piston (fuel chamber) (Figure 1). At the top of the piston are vent holes that are sealed by the load hanger retaining the reaction mass. At some point the pressure within the piston is of such a magnitude to force the load hanger arrangement upward at accelerations in order of 196m/s2 (20g). This process applies a load downwards on the test pile.

During the loading sequence the load applied to the test pile is monitored by a calibrated load cell incorporated in the base of the combustion piston. Pile settlement is measured using a remote laser reference source that falls on a photovoltaic cell incorporated in the piston. The laser reference source should be placed at least 15 m from the test pile to avoid the influence of test-induced ground surface wave disturbance (Brown & Hyde, 2006). Data capture is undertaken using a data acquisition system connected to a laptop computer. It is recommended to allow accurate data processing that sampling should be undertaken at frequencies above 1 kHz.

== Typical equipment ==
The most common form of Statnamic rigs typically have testing capacities of 3 to 4 MN. These devices are self-contained and may be transported using a single articulated lorry. Whilst on site they require the use of a mobile crane with a typical capacity of 70 tonnes, with mobilisation in less than 2 hours. In addition to these typical capacities, devices have been produced which can apply maximum loads ranging from 0.3 to 60 MN. To achieve greater loads the major components of the device, including the piston, silencer-weight hanger and reaction mass, must be scaled up in size.

The Statnamic weight packs usually consist of steel or concrete rings placed over the Statnamic silencer. As the device does not rely on gravity to apply loads as in static or drop weight testing it can be used vertically, horizontally and inclined to test raked piles. The ability to test horizontally has led to the method being used for lateral load testing of piles and simulation of ship impacts on mooring bodies. In order to improve the flexibility of the device and minimise transportation costs for offshore works, a device has also been tested that can apply up to 14 MN using water as a reaction mass. This is achieved in over-water pile tests by connecting the Statnamic device to a vessel full of water below the water body's surface, thus removing the need for heavy reaction weights.

The only significant difference between the smaller and larger testing devices is the method of catching the reaction mass. The catching method for larger tests uses gravel. This is achieved by placing the Statnamic device on the test pile and lowering the reaction mass onto its hanger. A large containing container is then placed around the assembly and filled with gravel. As the Statnamic weights move upwards the gravel moves to fill the void left and support the weights once movement has ceased. Due to the time required to place and remove the gravel after testing this method is reserved for tests above 16 MN. Smaller rigs utilise a hydraulic catching mechanism that allows the mass to be caught within the frame of the device. This allows up to ten individual piles to be tested in a day or multiple cycles on a single pile at 15-minute intervals. Further description of the hydraulic catching mechanism is given by Middendorp (2000). The most recent development is the mounting of a 1 MN Statnamic device on a 360° tracked excavator which allows rapid deployment (1 hour) and increased production.

== See also ==
- Dynamic load testing
