= Dynamic load testing =

Method to assess a pile's bearing capacity

Dynamic load testing (or dynamic loading) is a method to assess a pile's bearing capacity by applying a dynamic load to the pile head (a falling mass) while recording acceleration and strain on the pile head. Dynamic load testing is a high strain dynamic test which can be applied after pile installation for concrete piles. For steel or timber piles, dynamic load testing can be done during installation or after installation.

The procedure is standardized by ASTM D4945-00 Standard Test Method for High Strain Dynamic Testing of Piles. It may be performed on all piles, regardless of their installation method. In addition to bearing capacity, Dynamic Load Testing gives information on resistance distribution (shaft resistance and end bearing) and evaluates the shape and integrity of the foundation element.

The foundation bearing capacity results obtained with dynamic load tests correlate well with the results of static load tests performed on the same foundation element.

A sample specification can be implemented when accounting for geotechnical judgment based upon knowledge of the local soil conditions and deep foundation installation practice should be used to modify this sample specification to address the requirements of a specific project.

== See also ==
- Pile integrity test
