= Endurance time method =

The endurance time (ET) method is a dynamic structural analysis procedure for seismic assessment of structures. In this procedure, an intensifying dynamic excitation is used as the loading function. Endurance time method is a time-history based dynamic analysis procedure. An estimate of the structural response at different equivalent seismic intensity levels is obtained in a single response history analysis. This method has applications in seismic assessment of various structural types and in different areas of earthquake engineering.

== The concept of endurance time method ==
Endurance time (ET) method is a dynamic structural analysis procedure in which intensifying dynamic excitation is used as the loading function. An estimate of structural response and/or performance at the entire seismic intensity range of interest is obtained in each response history analysis. The concept of endurance time analysis is similar to the exercise test applied in medicine. Similar concept has also been extended to applications in the analysis of offshore platforms under water waves.

== Development history ==
The basic concepts of the endurance time method were published in 2004. Application in linear seismic analysis appeared in 2007. ET was subsequently extended to nonlinear analysis of single degree of freedom (SDOF) and multi degree of freedom systems. Procedures for multi-component seismic analysis were subsequently developed.

== ET excitation functions ==
ET excitation functions are generated by using numerical optimization methods. ET excitation functions are publicly available through internet websites. ET excitation functions can be categorized into five generations as follows:

1. First generation of ET excitation functions (ETEFs) are essentially a filtered and profiled white noise. These were used for demonstrating the concept of ET and have limited practical significance.
2. Second-generation ETEFs incorporate response spectrum matching. These ETEFs produce numerically significant analysis results.
3. Third-generation ETEFs are optimized in nonlinear range. These ETEFs deliver improved analysis performance.
4. Fourth-generation ETEFs are optimized to include duration consistency.
5. Fifth-generation ETEFs are optimized to include damage consistency.

Fig. 1. A typical endurance time excitation function (ETA20f03 record)

== Application areas in earthquake engineering ==
Endurance time method has been applied in the following areas of earthquake engineering:

- Nonlinear dynamic analysis of structures
- Seismic evaluation of jacket-type offshore platforms
- Optimal damper placement in framed buildings
- Optimal design of energy dissipation systems
- Seismic assessment of structures
- Performance-based seismic design method
- Collapse-based seismic design method
- Value-based seismic design
- Structural optimization
- Multi-component seismic analysis
- Soil–structure interaction
- soil-pile-superstructure interaction
- Liquid–structure interaction
- Dam engineering
- Bridge engineering
- Seismic rehabilitation
- Collapse analysis

== Structural type applications ==
ET method has been applied in seismic assessment of the following structural types:

- Single degree of freedom systems
- Moment and braced steel frames
- Concrete frames
- Bridges
- Gravity dams
- Arch dams
- Shell structures
- Steel tanks
- Offshore structures

== Advantages of ET method ==
Major advantages of the endurance time method are as follows:

- ET significantly reduces the computational demand required for performing a standard response history analysis of structures for seismic assessment, especially when response at multiple levels of intensity is to be considered.
- ET is applicable in a wide range of seismic assessment problems and provides a generic approach for the seismic analysis of a wide range of structural types.
- ET method is reasonably simple and sensible when a realistic dynamic analysis of a complex structure is required

== Limitations of ET method ==
Major limitations of the endurance time method are as follows:

- ET is an approximate method for predicting the structural response.
- The production of usable ETEFs that are applicable in a particular situation can be complicated.
- The procedure is still under development and sufficient background information may not be available for specific applications.
