= Wave equation analysis =

Wave equation analysis is a numerical method of analysis for the behavior of driven foundation piles. It predicts the pile capacity versus blow count relationship (bearing graph) and pile driving stress. The model mathematically represents the pile driving hammer and all its accessories (ram, cap, and cap block), as well as the pile, as a series of lumped masses and springs in a one-dimensional analysis. The soil response for each pile segment is modeled as viscoelastic-plastic. The method was first developed in the 1950s by E.A. Smith of the Raymond Pile Driving Company.

Wave equation analysis of piles has seen many improvements since the 1950s such as including a thermodynamic diesel hammer model and residual stress. Commercial software packages (such as AllWave-PDP and GRLWEAP) are now available to perform the analysis.

One of the principal uses of this method is the performance of a driveability analysis to select the parameters for safe pile installation, including recommendations on cushion stiffness, hammer stroke and other driving system parameters that optimize blow counts and pile stresses during pile driving. For example, when a soft or hard layer causes excessive stresses or unacceptable blow counts.
