= Ortman key =

An Ortman key is a coupling device used to secure two adjacent cylindrical segments of a pressure vessel common in tactical rocket motors. An Ortman key is made of elongated rectangular metal bar stock, such as steel, and is inserted into juxtaposed annular grooves around the circumference of the mating parts. The Ortman key assembly is used in high-pressure applications where packaging, strength and mass are important.

The Edmund key is a common variant of the Ortman key which is similar except has a feature added to the end of the key to aid in extraction of the key from the assembly.
