= Kentledge =

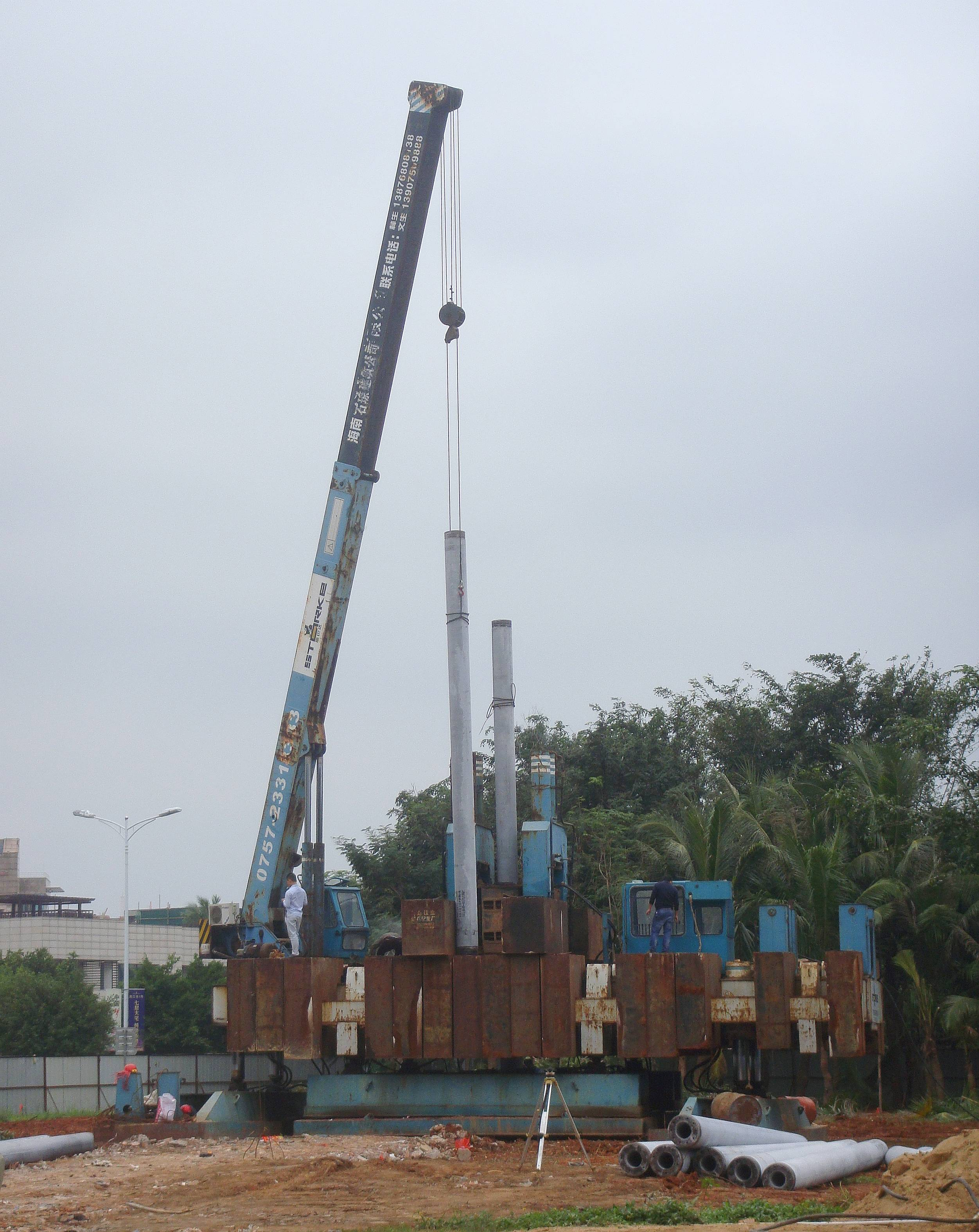
Iron kentledge weights upon a platform used in static load testing in Haikou, Hainan, China

Kentledge or kentledge weights are slabs or blocks of concrete or of iron (usually pig iron, sometimes with a cast-in handle to assist moving). They are used within ships or boats as permanent, high-density ballast. They may also be used as counterweights in cranes such as tower cranes or swing bridges like the Victoria Swing Bridge in Edinburgh. On construction sites, prior to the erection of a building, static load testing may use a large number of kentledges stacked onto a platform. This platform serves to drive piles into the ground beneath to test the integrity of the foundation.
