= Inflatable space structures =

Structures which use pressurized air

Inflatable space structures are structures which use pressurized air to maintain shape and rigidity. The technological approach has been employed from the early days of the space program with satellites such as Echo, to impact attenuation system that enabled the successful landing of the Pathfinder satellite and rover on Mars in 1997. Inflatable structures are also candidates for space structures, given their low weight, and hence easy transportability.

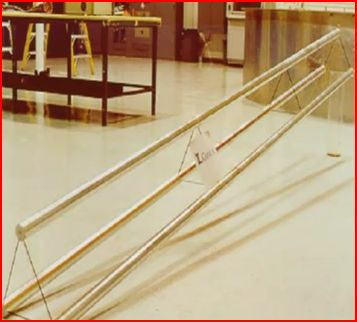
Inflatable Space Structure (2011)

== Application ==
Inflatable space structures use pressurized air or gas to maintain shape and rigidity. Notable examples of terrestrial inflatable structures include inflatable boats, and some military tents. The airships of the twentieth century are examples of the concept applied in the aviation environment.

NASA has investigated inflatable, deployable structures since the early 1950s. Concepts include inflatable satellites, booms, and antennas. Inflatable heatshields, decelerators, and airbags can be used for entry, descent and landing applications. Inflatable habitats, airlocks, and space stations are possible for in-space living spaces and surface exploration missions.

The Echo 1 satellite, launched in 1960, was large inflated satellite with a diameter of 30 meters and coated with reflective material that allowed for radio signals to be bounced off its surface. The satellite was sent to orbit in a flat-folded configuration and inflated once in orbit. The airbags used on the Mars Pathfinder mission descent and landing in 1997 are an example of use of an inflatable system for impact attenuation.

Space Solar Power (SSP) solutions employing inflatable structures have been designed and qualified for space by NASA engineers.

NASA is testing a deployable heat shield solution in space as a secondary payload on the launch that will deliver the NASA JPSS-2 launch in late 2022. The Low-Earth Orbit Flight Test of an Inflatable Decelerator (LOFTID) is designed to demonstrate aerobraking and re-entry from 18,000 miles per hour after separation from the launch vehicle adapter structure.

The space station concepts developed by Bigelow Aerospace is an example of an inflatable crewed orbital space habitat.
