= Arching or compressive membrane action in reinforced concrete slabs =

Idealisation of arching action forces in laterally restrained slab

Arching or compressive membrane action (CMA) in reinforced concrete slabs occurs as a result of the great difference between the tensile and compressive strength of concrete. Cracking of the concrete causes a migration of the neutral axis which is accompanied by in-plane expansion of the slab at its boundaries. If this natural tendency to expand is restrained, the development of arching action enhances the strength of the slab. The term arching action is normally used to describe the arching phenomenon in one-way spanning slabs and compressive membrane action is normally used to describe the arching phenomenon in two-way spanning slabs.

== Background ==
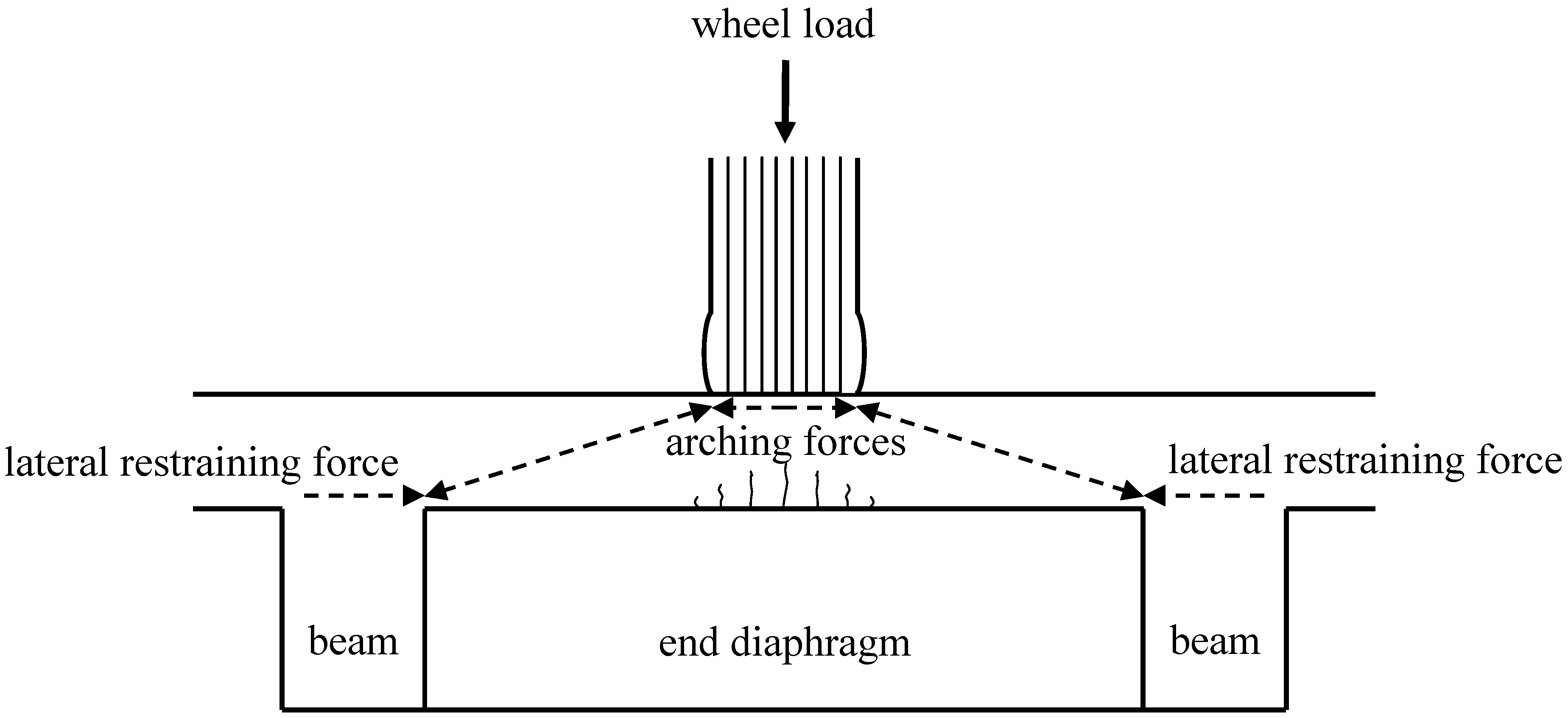
Arching action forces in beam and slab bridge deck

The strength enhancing effects of arching action in reinforced concrete floors were first recognised near the beginning of last century. However, it was not until the full scale destructive load tests by Ockleston on the Old Dental Hospital in Johannesburg that the extent of strength enhancement caused by arching action was really appreciated. In these tests, collapse loads of between 3 and 4 times those predicted by yield-line theory were obtained.

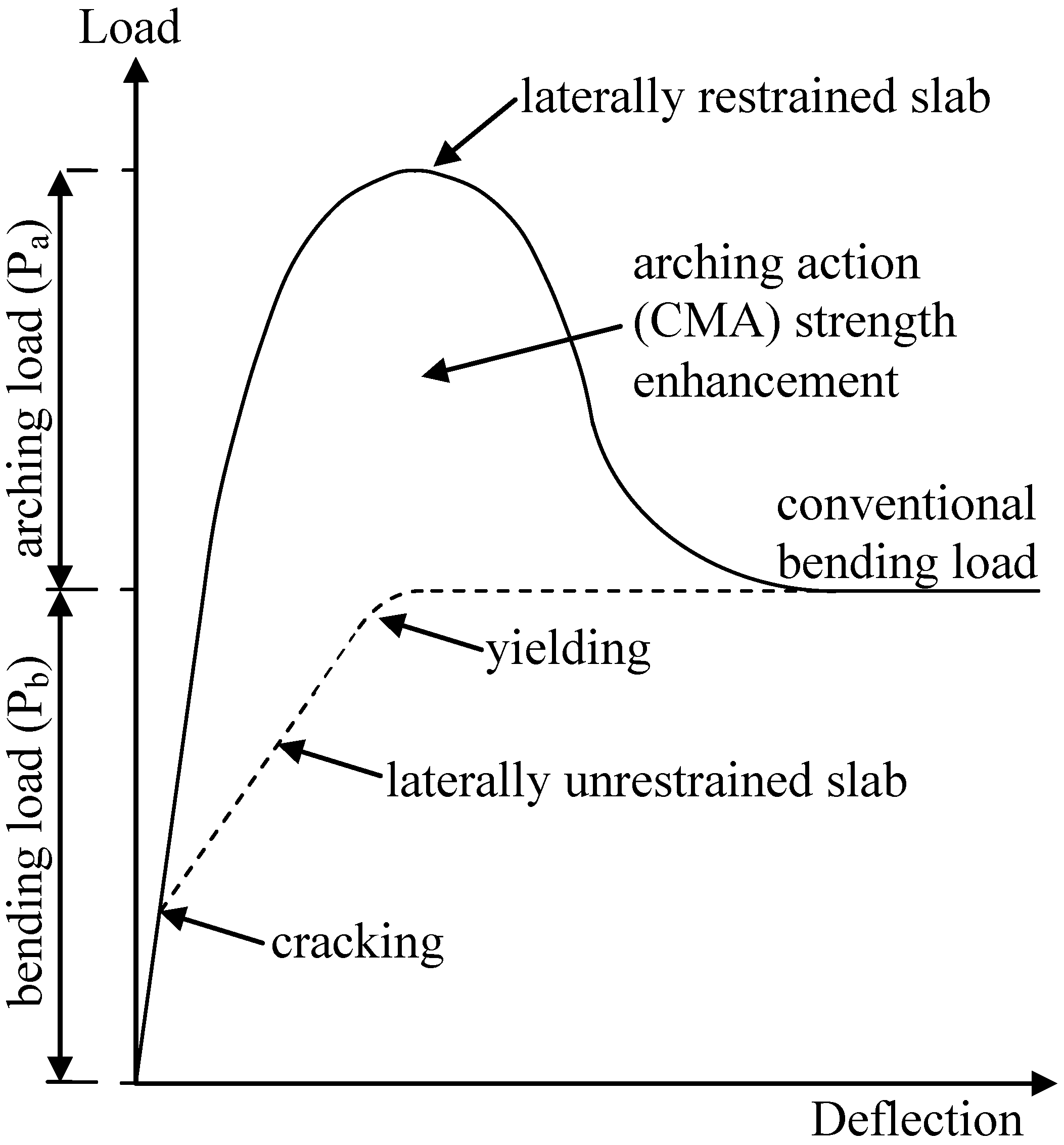
Arching action (CMA) strength enhancement in laterally restrained slab strip

== Approaches to treatment of arching action (CMA) ==
Since the 1950s there have been several attempts to develop theories for arching action in both one and two-way slabs. One of the principal approaches to membrane action was that due to Park which has been used as a basis for many studies into arching action in slabs. Park's approach was based on rigid plastic slab strip theory, and required the assumption of a critical deflection of one half of the slab depth at failure. Park's approach was later extended by Park and Gamble in their method for predicting the plastic load-deformation response of laterally restrained slabs.

In 1971, the American Concrete Institute produced a special publication which presented the most recent research, to that time, on arching and compressive membrane action in reinforced concrete slabs.

A comprehensive review of the literature and studies of both rigid-plastic and elastic-plastic approaches to arching have been compiled by Braestrup and Braestrup and Morley. Lahlouh and Waldron were some of the earliest researchers to achieve a degree of success in finite element modelling of the phenomenon. In 1993, Kuang and Morley presented a plasticity approach which included the effect of compressive membrane action on the punching shear strength of laterally restrained concrete slabs.

== United Kingdom approach to CMA in bridge deck design ==
In the United Kingdom, the method developed by Kirkpatrick, Rankin & Long in 1984 and substantiated by testing a full-scale bridge in 1986 first led to the introduction of new rules for the economic design of reinforced concrete beam and slab bridge decks in Northern Ireland. The concept and method were later incorporated, by the United Kingdom Highways Agency, into the UK design manual for roads and bridges, BD 81/02, 'Use of Compressive Membrane Action in Bridge Decks'. Use of this CMA methodology normally results in substantial savings in reinforcement in the slab of a beam and slab bridge deck, provided certain limitations and boundary conditions are satisfied.

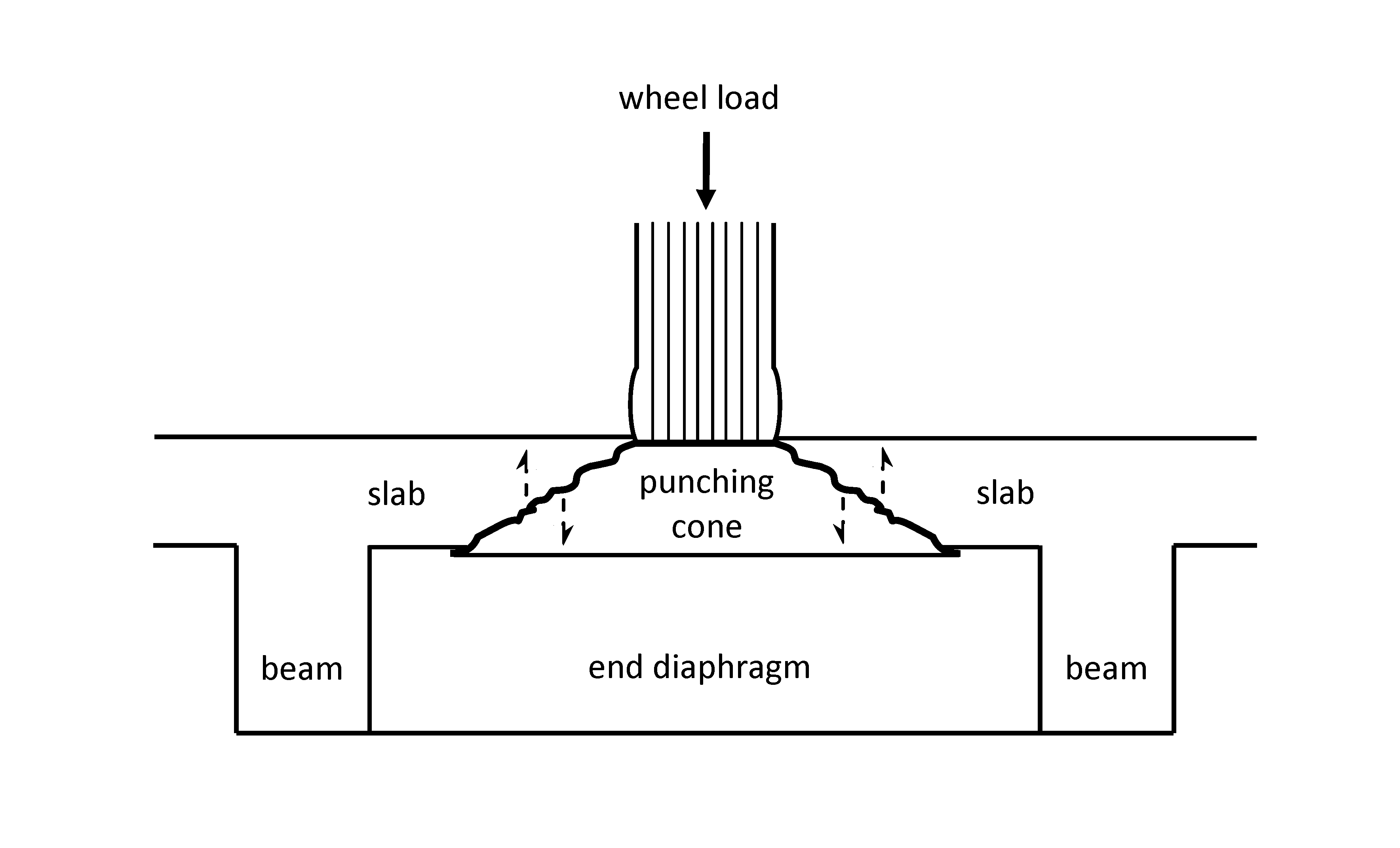
Punching failure in beam and slab bridge deck

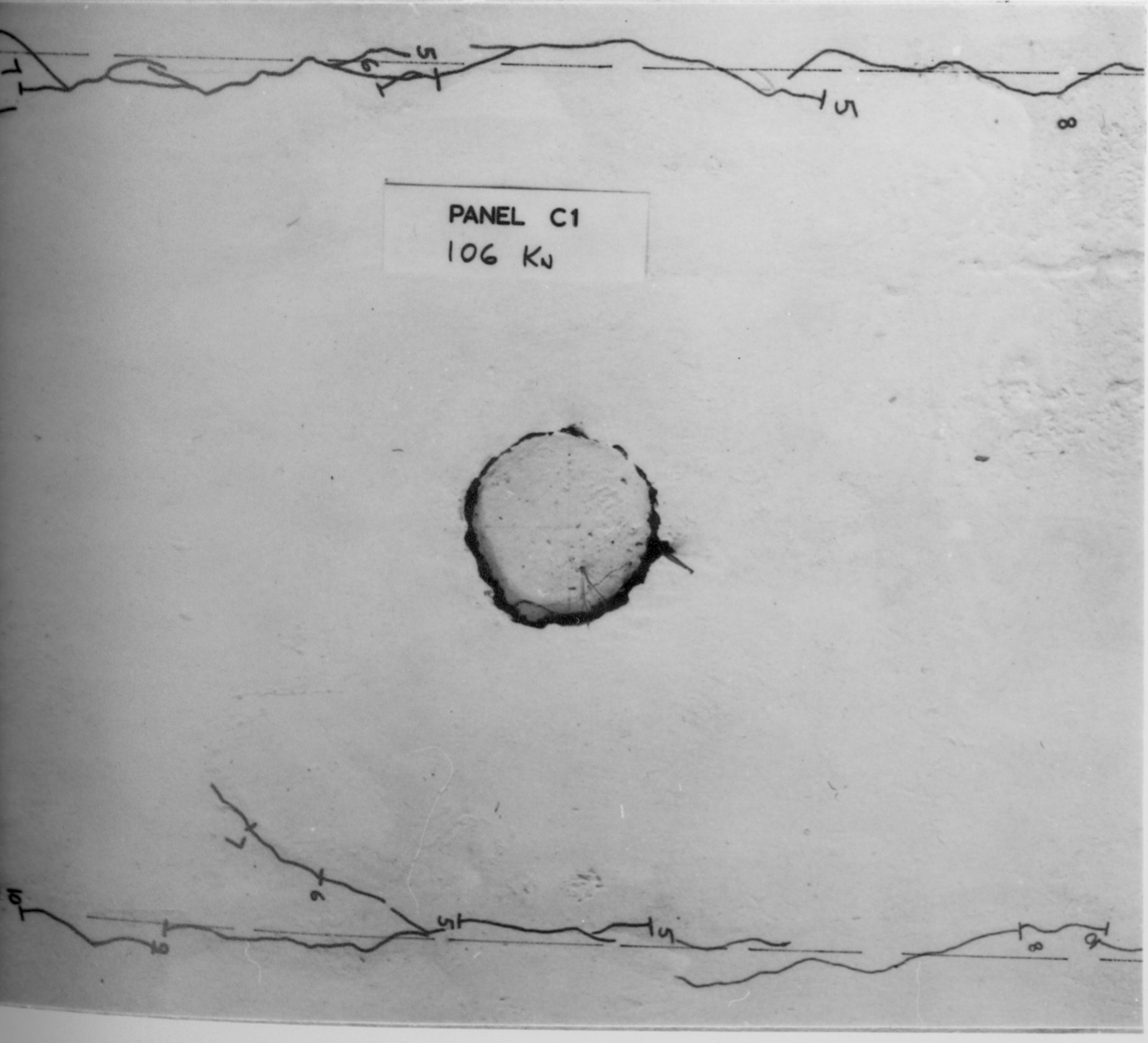
Top surface crack pattern of punching failure zone in model bridge deck test

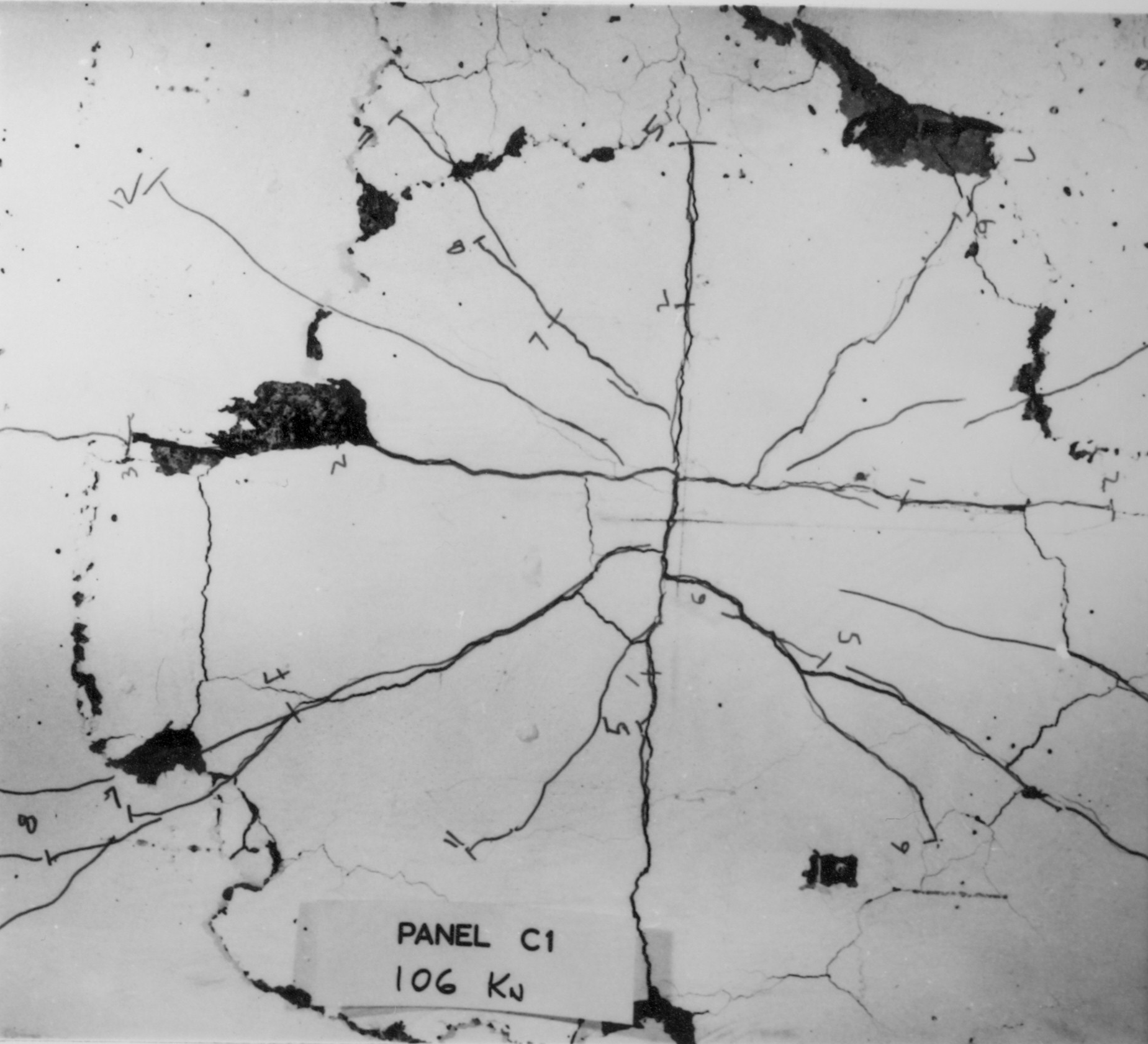
Bottom surface crack pattern of punching failure zone in model bridge deck test

Kirkpatrick, Rankin & Long's approach to the prediction of the enhanced punching strength of bridge deck slabs was based on the punching shear prediction equation derived by Long for the shear mode of punching failure, combined with an effective reinforcement ratio, which represented the arching action strength enhancement. The effective reinforcement ratio was determined from the maximum arching moment of resistance in a rigidly restrained concrete slab, which Rankin had derived for laterally restrained concrete slabs from McDowell, McKee and Sevin's arching action deformation theory for masonry walls. The derivation of the maximum arching moment of resistance of laterally restrained concrete bridge deck slabs utilised Rankin's idealised elastic-plastic stress-strain criterion for concrete, valid for concrete cylinder strengths up to at least 70N/mm^{2}, which he had derived on the basis of Hognestad, Hanson and McHenry's ultimate parabolic stress block coefficients for concrete. The adaptation of Kirkpatrick, Rankin & Long's punching strength prediction method for laterally restrained bridge deck slabs, given in BD 81/02, is summarised as follows:

The concrete equivalent cylinder strength, $f_{\text{c}}$, is given by:

$f_{\text{c}} = \frac{ 0.8f_{\text{cu}} } {\gamma_{\text{m}} }$	Equation 1

The plastic strain value, $\varepsilon_{\text{c}}$, of an idealised elastic-plastic concrete is given by:

$\varepsilon_{\text{c}} = { \left( -400+60f_{\text{c}}-0.33f_{\text{c}} ^2\right) x 10^{-6}}$	Equation 2

The non-dimensional parameter, $R$, for the arching moment of resistance is given by:

$R = \frac{ \varepsilon_{\text{c}} L_{\text{r}} ^2 } {h^2}$	Equation 3

In order to treat the slab as restrained, $R$ must be less than 0.26. If $R$ is greater than 0.26, the deck slab shall be treated as if it were unrestrained.

The non-dimensional arching moment coefficient, $k$, is given by:

$k = { 0.0525\left( 4.3-16.1\sqrt{3.3 x 10^{-4} +0.1243R}\right) }$	Equation 4

The effective reinforcement ratio, $\rho_{\text{e}}$, is given by:

$\rho_{\text{e}} = k\left [ \frac{f_{\text{c}} }{240} \right ] \left [ \frac{h}{d} \right ]^2$	Equation 5

The predicted ultimate punching load for a single wheel, $P_{\text{ps}}$ (N), is given by:

$P_{\text{ps}} = { 1.52\left( \phi+d\right)d\sqrt{f_{\text{c}} }\left(100\rho_{\text{e}} \right)^{0.25} }$	Equation 6

where:

- $d$ = average effective depth to tensile reinforcement (mm)
- $f_{\text{cu}}$ = characteristic concrete cube strength (N/mm^{2})
- $h$ = overall slab depth (mm)
- $L_{\text{r}}$ = half span of slab strip with boundary restraint (mm)
- $\phi$ = diameter of loaded area (mm)
- $\gamma_{\text{m}}$ = partial safety factor for strength

Further details on the derivation of the method and how to deal with situations of less than rigid lateral restraint are given by Rankin and Rankin & Long. Long and Rankin claim that the concepts of arching or compressive membrane action in beam and slab bridge decks are also applicable to flat slab and cellular reinforced concrete structures where considerable strength enhancements over design code predictions can also be achieved.

Research into arching or compressive membrane action has continued over the years at Queen's University Belfast, with the work of Niblock, who investigated the effects of CMA in uniformly loaded laterally restrained slabs; Skates, who researched CMA in cellular concrete structures; Ruddle, who researched arching action in laterally restrained rectangular and Tee-beams; Peel-Cross, who researched CMA in composite floor slab construction; Taylor who researched CMA in high strength concrete bridge deck slabs, and Shaat who researched CMA using Finite Element Analysis (FEA) techniques. A comprehensive guide to compressive membrane action in concrete bridge decks, was compiled by Taylor, Rankin and Cleland in 2002.

== North American approach to CMA in bridge-deck design ==
In North America, a more pragmatic approach has been adopted and research into compressive membrane action has primarily stemmed from the work of Hewitt and Batchelor and Batchelor and Tissington in the 1970s. They carried out an extensive series of field tests, which led to the introduction of an empirical method of design into the Ontario Highway Bridge Design Code in 1979. This required minimum isotropic reinforcement (0.3%) in bridge deck slabs, provided certain boundary conditions were satisfied. In the 1990s Mufti et al. extended this research and showed that significant enhancements in the durability of laterally restrained slabs can be achieved by utilising fibre reinforced deck slabs without steel reinforcement. Later, Mufti and Newhook adapted Hewitt and Batchelor's model to develop a method for evaluating the ultimate capacity of fibre reinforced deck slabs using external steel straps for the provision of lateral restraint.
