= Plastic moment =

Property of a structural cross-section

If you bend a metal paperclip or a coat hanger far enough, it stops springing back and stays bent – it has been permanently deformed.

In structural engineering, the plastic moment (M_{p}) describes the equivalent point for a structural beam: it is the bending moment at which an entire cross-section has yielded and stops springing back elastically, becoming permanently bent. At this moment, the entire cross section has reached its yield stress. This is theoretically the maximum bending moment the section can resist — when this point is reached, a plastic hinge is formed, and any load beyond it will result in theoretically infinite plastic deformation.

In practice, most metals stiffen somewhat once bent this far, a behavior called work hardening, which explains the phenomenon by which such metal becomes progressively stronger, harder and undergoes plastic deformation at temperatures below its recrystallization temperature.

== Calculation ==
Calculating the plastic moment $M_p$ first requires determining the plastic section modulus $Z_P$ and then to substitute this into the following formula:

$$M_p=Z_P  \sigma_y$$

For example, the plastic moment for a rectangular section can be calculated with the following formula:

$M_p= (bd^2 / 4 )\sigma_y$

where

$b$ is the width of the section,
$d$ is the height of the vertical midpoint of the stress concentration diagram
$\sigma_y$ is the yield stress

The plastic moment for a given section will always be larger than the yield moment (the bending moment at which the first part of the sections reaches the yield stress).

== See also ==
- Structural engineering theory
- Plasticity (physics)
