= Lally column =

Structural steel column filled with concrete

A Lally column is a round or square thin-walled structural steel column filled with concrete, and oriented vertically to provide support to beams or timbers stretching over long spans. Historically, Lally columns were made of steel up to 6.4 millimeters (1/4 in) in thickness; today, that has been reduced in instances to 1.5 millimeters (0.06 in). As engineered structural load-bearing components, Lally columns must be installed to their specific design specs.

== Fabrication ==
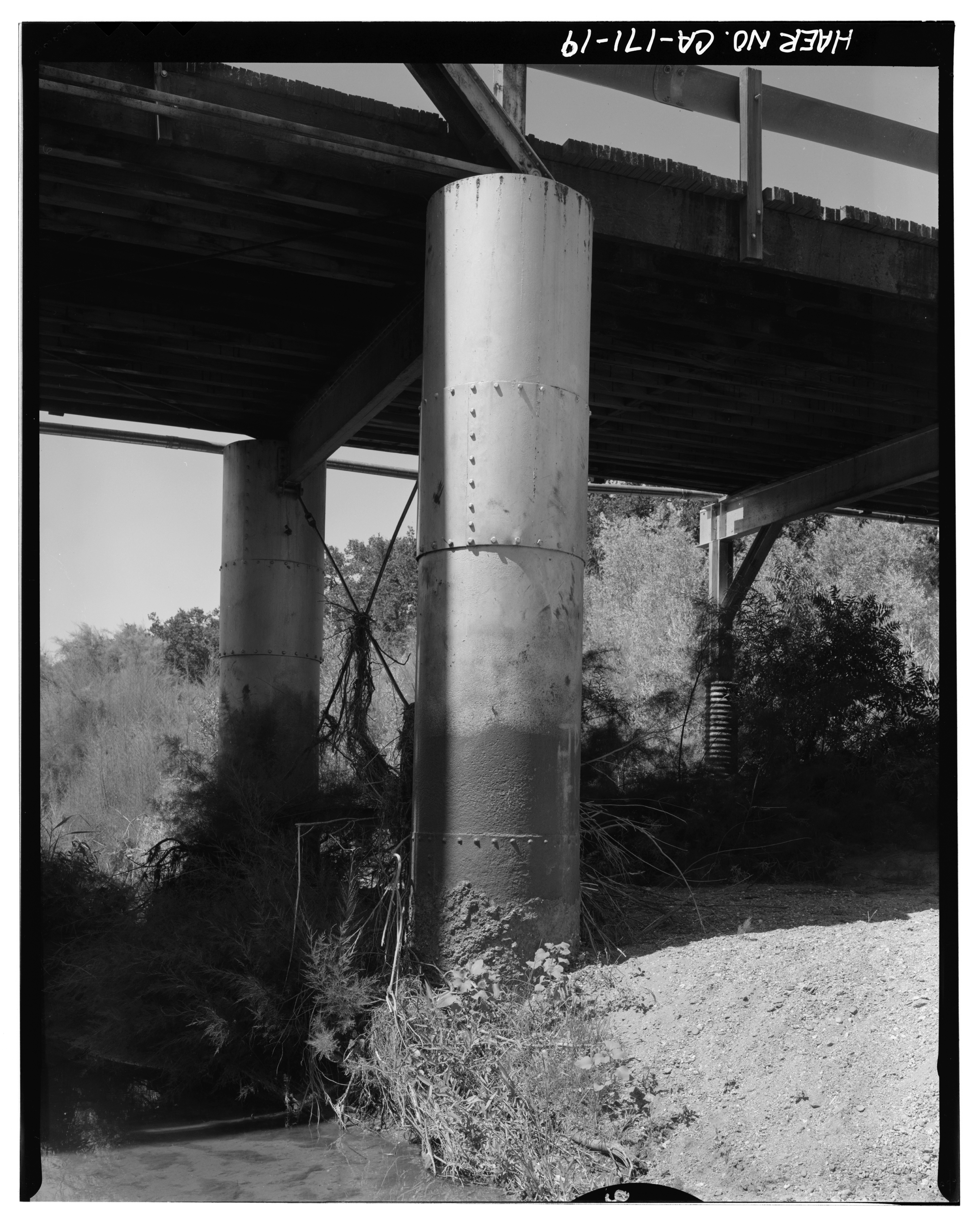
A Lally column at the northwest end of truss of the Red Bank Creek Bridge at Rawson Road, Red Bluff, Tehama, California, United States

A Lally column is formed of tubular steel. It is then filled with concrete, which carries a share of the compression load, and helps prevent local buckling of the shell.

In addition to its low cost, an advantage of a generic Lally column over a custom structural steel column (or conventional I-beam) is that it may be purchased in its tubular state and cut to length on a construction site with standard jobsite power tools such as an angle grinder or reciprocating saw fitted with appropriate metal cutting blades. Lally columns are generally not as strong or durable as conventional structural steel columns.

The term "Lally column" is sometimes confused with a screw jack, a temporary rather than permanent steel support.

== Invention ==
The Lally column is named after a U.S. inventor, John Lally, who owned a construction company that started production of these columns in the late 19th century. He resided in Waltham, Massachusetts, United States, and Boston during the period 1898–1907. He was issued four U.S. patents on composite columns: Nos. 614729, 869869, 901453, and 905888. Patent No. 869869 was assigned to the U.S. Column Company of Cambridge, Massachusetts.

== Design development ==
Early Lally columns were made with structural steel, "standard" pipes, with wall thicknesses slightly less than 6.4 millimeters (1/4 in). Modern Lally columns are typically made with 16-gauge (approximately 1.5 millimeters or 0.06 inches) shells. Modern Lallies are therefore much lower in strength than the older ones (typically less than half the strength), and are also much more subject to damage by corrosion in moist environments.

Modern Lally columns are primarily intended as somewhat stronger and more durable substitutes for wood posts in light-frame wood construction, although they are sometimes also used with steel beams.
