= Plastic hinge =

Engineering concept

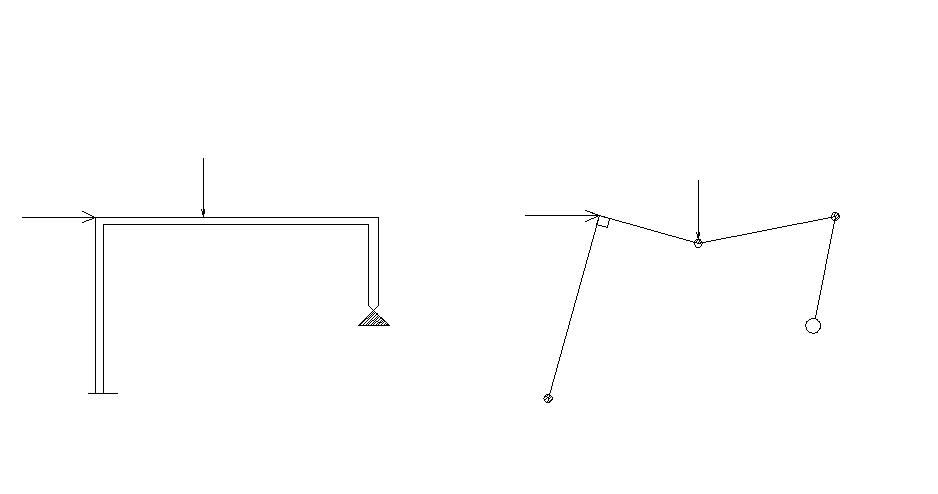
Diagram of a structure featuring plastic hinges

In the structural engineering beam theory, plastic hinge is the deformation of a section of a beam where plastic bending occurs. In earthquake engineering plastic hinge is also a type of energy damping device allowing plastic rotation [deformation] of an otherwise rigid column connection.

== Plastic behaviour ==
In plastic limit analysis of structural members subjected to bending, it is assumed that an abrupt transition from elastic to ideally plastic behaviour occurs at a certain value of moment, known as plastic moment (M_{p}). Member behaviour between M_{yp} and M_{p} is considered to be elastic. When M_{p} is reached, a plastic hinge is formed in the member. In contrast to a frictionless hinge permitting free rotation, it is postulated that the plastic hinge allows large rotations to occur at constant plastic moment M_{p}.

Plastic hinges extend along short lengths of beams. Actual values of these lengths depend on cross-sections and load distributions. But detailed analyses have shown that it is sufficiently accurate to consider beams rigid-plastic, with plasticity confined to plastic hinges at points. While this assumption is sufficient for limit state analysis, finite element formulations are available to account for the spread of plasticity along plastic hinge lengths.

By inserting a plastic hinge at a plastic limit load into a statically determinate beam, a kinematic mechanism permitting an unbounded displacement of the system can be formed. It is known as the collapse mechanism. For each degree of static indeterminacy of the beam, an additional plastic hinge must be added to form a collapse mechanism.
