= Structural pipe fitting =

A structural pipe fitting, also known as a slip on pipe fitting, clamp or pipe clamp is used to build structures such as handrails, guardrails, and other types of pipe or tubular structure. They can also be used to build furniture and theatrical riggings. The fittings slip on the pipe and are usually locked down with a set screw. The set screw can then be tightened with a simple hex wrench. Because of the modular design of standard fittings, assembly is easy, only simple hand tools are required, and risks from welding a structure are eliminated.

Other advantages of using structural pipe fittings are easy installation and reconfigurable design. Since there are no permanent welds in the structure, the set screws of the fittings can simply be loosened, allowing them to be repositioned. The project can be disassembled and stored if needed, or even taken apart with fittings and pipe recycled into a new project.

Fittings used for strong structures are galvanised malleable iron castings, and come in many styles such as elbows, tees, crosses, reducers and flanges. The fittings are not threaded; they simply lock onto the pipe with the supplied hex set screws.

== See also ==
- Kee Klamp
