= International Structural Engineering and Construction Society =

International Structural Engineering and Construction Society (ISEC)
- Formation: January 24, 2001
- Type: Engineering Society
- Headquarters: Fargo, North Dakota, United States
- Official language: English
- President: Amarjit Singh
- Key people: Frank Yazdani, Dejan Dinevski, Asli Pelin Gurgun, Valentina Villa, Marco Domaneschi, Hossein Askarinjead
- Website: www.isec-society.org

The International Structural Engineering and Construction Society (ISEC) is a non-profit professional body founded in 2001 to represent members of the civil engineering, structural engineering, and construction engineering profession worldwide. Based in Fargo, North Dakota, it offers educational conferences, seminars, and literature through an international network of advisors and regional representatives.

== ISEC Press ==
In 2014, ISEC Society launched ISEC Press as a publishing subsidiary. The title is now known as "Proceedings of International Structural Engineering and Construction," carrying an ISSN number of 2644-108X, and is registered with Crossref as journal articles.

The articles go through a rigorous peer-review process. Abstracts are reviewed double-blind, whereas the manuscripts are reviewed single-blind. All articles go through similarity checks and an extensive copyediting process.

== Publications ==
To date, ISEC has published its proceedings from international and regional conferences, containing more than 4,200 peer-reviewed articles from ~74 countries. These are accessible in the ISEC Proceedings Archive.

== Sponsors, co-sponsors, promoters, and endorsers ==
ISEC Society conferences have been supported by a large number of professional organizations.

== Registrations, indexing, archiving ==
All titles of the Proceedings of International Structural Engineering and Construction carry a DOI number, are registered with Crossref as journal articles, indexed in Scopus, and archived in ClockSS.
