= CT510 =

Video game console

- Also known as: iSec, eBox, CT310, CT520
- Developer: eedoo
- Generation: Seventh
- Released: April 29, 2012
- Introductory price: 3,799 yuan
- CPU: 2 cores @ 1.8 GHz
- Storage: 32GB (CT310), 250GB (CT510), or 320GB (CT520)
- Graphics: 3D capable
- Input: Motion control
- Controller input: Remote control
- Camera: 320px x 240px Softkinetic CMOS depth sensing camera
- Connectivity: Online capable
- Marketing target: China

The CT510 (previously known as the iSec (Sports Entertainment Center) and eBox) is a video game console created by Eedoo Technology, a company created by Lenovo, with 40 Lenovo employees and investment of an undisclosed sum of money from the Lenovo Group, Legend Holdings and Legend Capital. It was first announced on August 30, 2010, to be marketed in China only upon its release, with further releases in the Asian-Pacific and worldwide markets planned if the console proves to be successful. The console was released in April 2012. To circumvent a ban on video game consoles, the system was advertised as a multimedia device.

== Specifications ==
The eBox is a controller-less video game console, coming prepackaged with similar video tracking features as Microsoft's Kinect for the Xbox 360.

== Games ==
There are 8 known games pre-installed on the CT510: Flyer's Story, Fun Park Adventure, Kung Fu Live, Maya Fit, Hole in the Wall, Bumper Cars, Green Exercise, Dance.
