= Middle-third rule =

Civil engineering concept

In civil engineering, the middle-third rule states that no tension is developed in a wall or foundation if the resultant force lies within the middle third of the structure.

The rule is covered by various standard texts in the field of civil engineering, for instance Principles of Foundation Engineering by B.M. Das. The application of this rule is limited to foundations that are square or rectangular in plan. (For circular foundations a different rule, known as the Middle Quarter Rule applies).
