= Deformation mechanism =

Microscopic processes responsible for changes in a material's structure, shape and volume

In geology and materials science, a deformation mechanism is a process occurring at a microscopic scale that is responsible for deformation: changes in a material's internal structure, shape and volume. The process involves planar discontinuity and/or displacement of atoms from their original position within a crystal lattice structure. These small changes are preserved in various microstructures of materials such as rocks, metals and plastics, and can be studied in depth using optical or digital microscopy.

== Processes ==
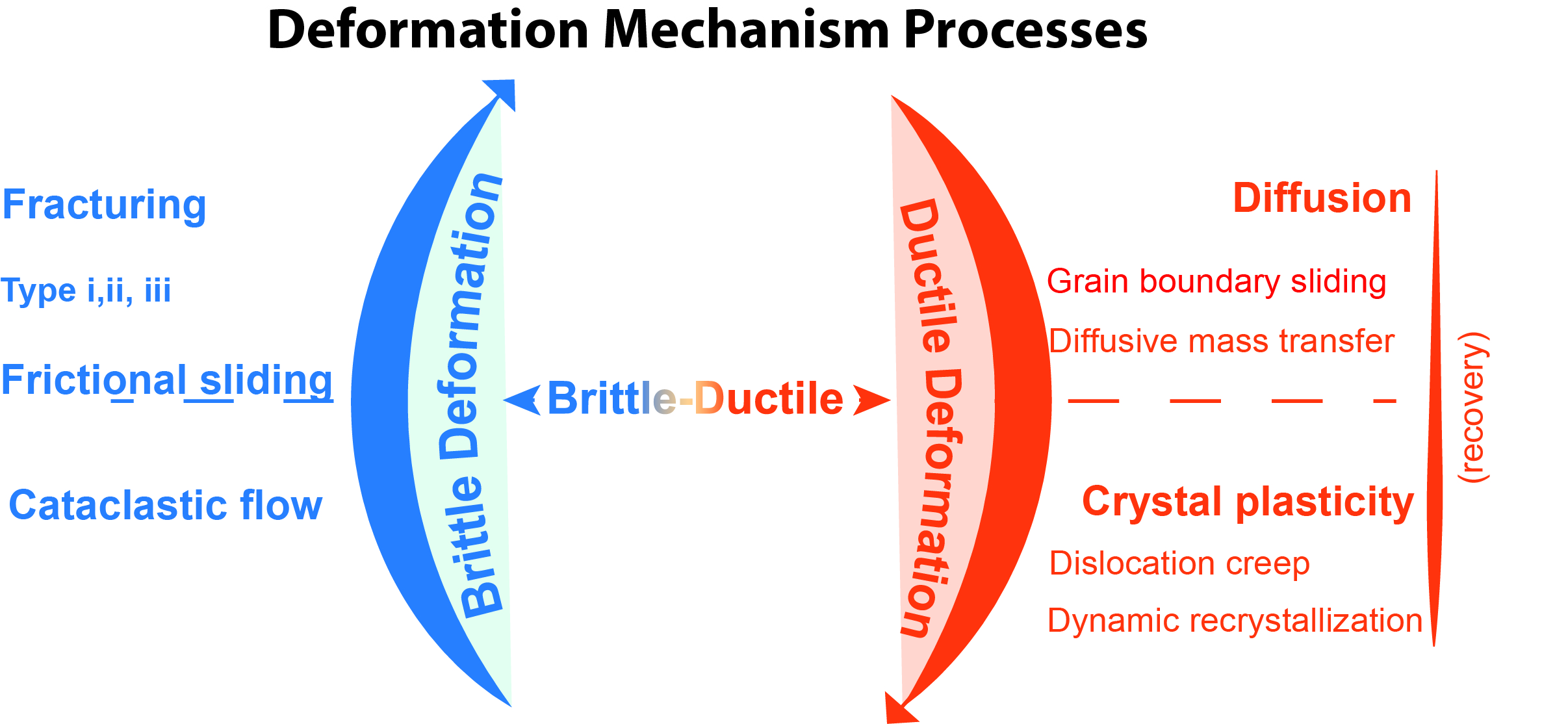
Summary of various mechanisms process that occurs within brittle and ductile conditions. These mechanisms can overlap in the brittle-ductile settings.

Deformation mechanisms are commonly characterized as brittle, ductile, and brittle-ductile. The driving mechanism responsible is an interplay between internal (e.g. composition, grain size and lattice-preferred orientation) and external (e.g. temperature and fluid pressure) factors. These mechanisms produce a range of micro-structures studied in rocks to constrain the conditions, rheology, dynamics, and motions of tectonic events. More than one mechanism may be active under a given set of conditions and some mechanisms can develop independently. Detailed microstructure analysis can be used to define the conditions and timing under which individual deformation mechanisms dominate for some materials. Common deformation mechanisms processes include:

§ Fracturing
§ Cataclastic flow
§ Grain boundary sliding
§ Diffusive mass transfer
§ Dislocation creep
§ Dynamic recrystallization (recovery)

=== Fracturing ===
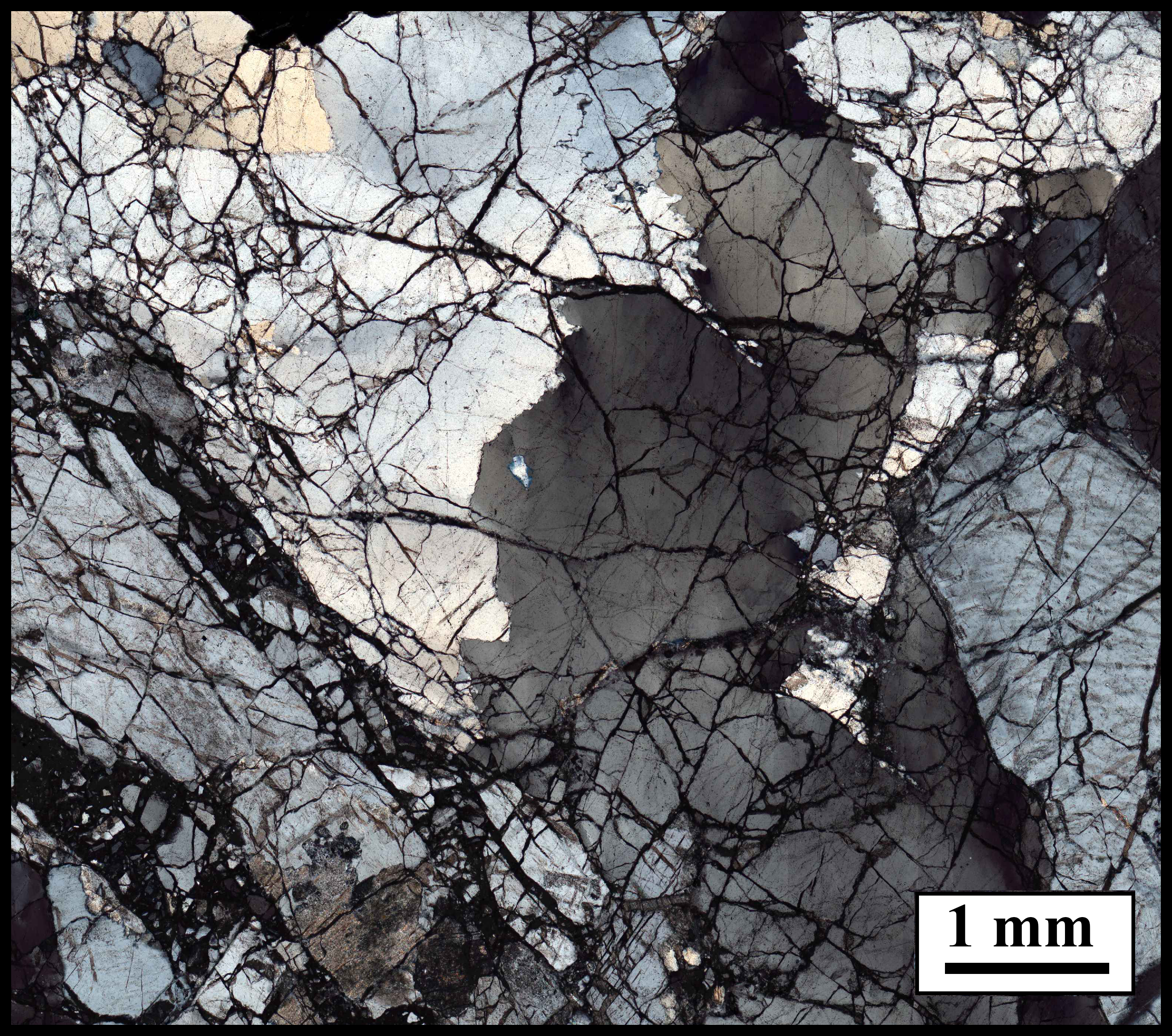
Cross polarized image of a high concentration of variably oriented joints within a granitic rock from the San Andreas Fault, California. No obvious displacement along fractures.

Fracturing is a brittle deformation process that creates permanent linear breaks, that are not accompanied by displacement within materials. These linear breaks or openings can be independent or interconnected. For fracturing to occur, the ultimate strength of the materials need to be exceeded to a point where the material ruptures. Rupturing is aided by the accumulations of high differential stress (the difference between the maximum and minimum stress acting on the object). Most fracture grow into faults. However, the term fault is only used when the fracture plane accommodate some degree of movement. Fracturing can happen across all scales, from microfractures to macroscopic fractures and joints in the rocks.

=== Cataclastic flow ===
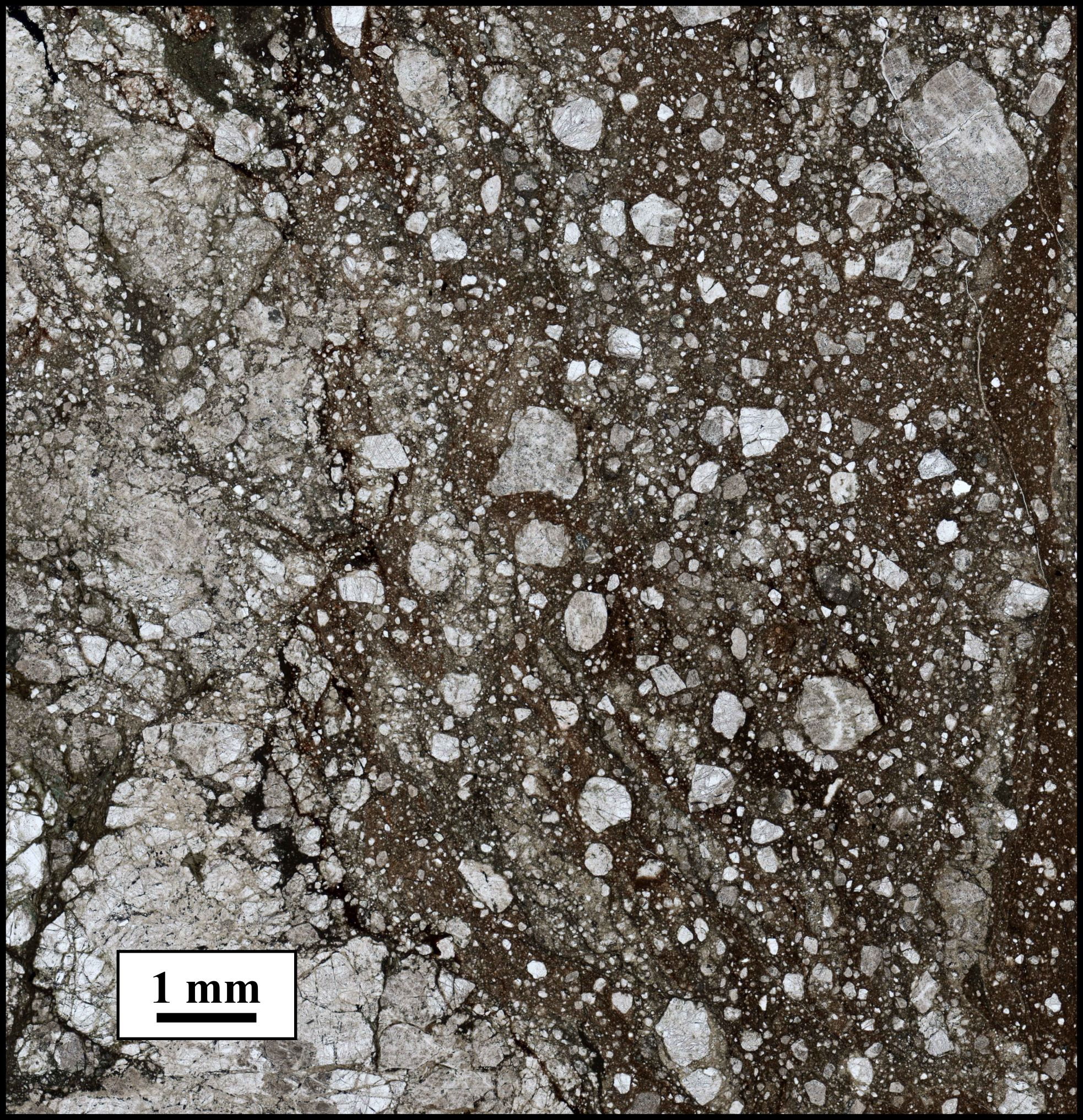
Rounded to sub-rounded grains within very fine grained matrix. Fracture processes "grind"/"roll"/"slide" grains past each other creating the rounded appearance of the individual grains.

Cataclasis, or comminution, is a non-elastic brittle mechanism that operates under low to moderate homologous temperatures, low confining pressure and relatively high strain rates. It occurs only above a certain differential stress level, which is dependent on fluid pressure and temperature. Cataclasis accommodates the fracture and crushing of grains, causing grain size reduction, along with frictional sliding on grain boundaries and rigid body grain rotation. Intense cataclasis occurs in thin zones along slip or fault surfaces where extreme grain size reduction occurs. In rocks, cataclasis forms a cohesive and fine-grained fault rock called cataclasite. Cataclastic flow occurs during shearing when a rock deform by microfracturing and frictional sliding where tiny fractures (microcracks), and associated rock fragments move past each other. Cataclastic flow usually occurs at diagenetic to low-grade metamorphic conditions. However, this depends on the mineralogy of the material and the extent of pore fluid pressure. Cataclastic flow is generally unstable and will terminate by the localization of deformation into slip on fault planes.

=== Grain boundary sliding ===
Grain boundary sliding is a plastic deformation mechanism where crystals can slide past each other without friction and without creating significant voids as a result of diffusion. The deformation process associated with this mechanism is referred to as granular flow. The absence of voids results from solid-state diffusive mass transfer, locally enhanced crystal plastic deformation, or solution and precipitation of a grain boundary fluid. This mechanism operates at a low strain rate produced by neighbor switching. Grain boundary sliding is grain size- and temperature-dependent. It is favored by high temperatures and the presence of very fine-grained aggregates where diffusion paths are relatively short. Large strains operating in this mechanism do not result in the development of a lattice preferred orientation or any appreciable internal deformation of the grains, except at the grain boundary to accommodate the grain sliding; this process is called superplastic deformation.

=== Diffusive mass transfer ===
In this group of mechanisms, the strain is accommodated by migration of vacancies in crystallographic lattice. This results in a change in crystal shape involving the transfer of mass by diffusion. These migrations are oriented towards sites of maximum stress and are limited by the grain boundaries; which conditions a crystallographic shape fabric or strain. The result is a more perfect crystal. This process is grain-size sensitive and occurs at low strain rates or very high temperatures, and is accommodated by migration of lattice defects from areas of low to those of high compressive stress. The main mechanisms of diffusive mass transfer are Nabarro-Herring creep, Coble creep, and pressure solution.

Nabarro–herring creep, or volume diffusion, acts at high homologous temperatures and is grain size dependent with the strain-rate inversely proportional to the square of the grain size (creep rate decreases as the grain size increases). During Nabarro-Herring creep, the diffusion of vacancies occurs through the crystal lattice (microtectonics), which causes grains to elongate along the stress axis. Nabarro-Herring creep has a weak stress dependence.

Coble creep, or grain-boundary diffusion, is the diffusion of vacancies occurs along grain-boundaries to elongate the grains along the stress axis. Coble creep has a stronger grain-size dependence than Nabarro–Herring creep, and occurs at lower temperatures while remaining temperature dependent. It play a more important role than Nabarro–Herring creep and is more important in the deformation of the plastic crust.

=== Dislocation creep ===
Dislocation creep is a non-linear (plastic) deformation mechanism in which vacancies in the crystal glide and climb past obstruction sites within the crystal lattice. These migrations within the crystal lattice can occur in one or more directions and are triggered by the effects of increased differential stress. It occurs at lower temperatures relative to diffusion creep. The mechanical process presented in dislocation creep is called slip. The principal direction in which dislocation takes place are defined by a combination of slip planes and weak crystallographic orientations resulting from vacancies and imperfections in the atomic structure. Each dislocation causes a part of the crystal to shift by one lattice point along the slip plane, relative to the rest of the crystal. Each crystalline material has different distances between atoms or ions in the crystal lattice, resulting in different lengths of displacement. The vector that characterizes the length and orientation of the displacement is called the Burgers vector. The development of strong lattice preferred orientation can be interpreted as evidence for dislocation creep as dislocations move only in specific lattice planes.

Dislocation glide cannot act on its own to produce large strains due to the effects of strain-hardening, where a dislocation ‘tangle’ can inhibit the movement of other dislocations, which then pile up behind the blocked ones causing the crystal to become difficult to deform. Diffusion and dislocation creep can occur simultaneously. The effective viscosity of a stressed material under given conditions of temperature, pressure, and strain rate will be determined by the mechanism that delivers the smallest viscosity. Some form of recovery process, such as dislocation climb or grain-boundary migration must also be active. Slipping of the dislocation results in a more stable state for the crystal as the pre-existing imperfection is removed. It requires much lower differential stress than that required for brittle fracturing. This mechanism does not damage the mineral or reduce the internal strength of crystals.

=== Dynamic recrystallization ===
Dynamic recrystallization is the process of removing the internal strain that remains in grains during deformation. This happens by the reorganization of a material with a change in grain size, shape, and orientation within the same mineral. When recrystallization occurs after deformation has come to an end and particularly at high temperatures, the process is called static recrystallization or annealing. Dynamic recrystallization results in grain size-reduction and static recrystallization results in the formation of larger equant grains.

Dynamic recrystallization can occur under a wide range of metamorphic conditions, and can strongly influence the mechanical properties of the deforming material. Dynamic recrystallization is the result of two end-member processes: (1) The formation and rotation of subgrains (rotation recrystallization) and (2) grain-boundary migration (migration recrystallization).

1. Rotation recrystallization (subgrain rotation) is the progressive misorientation of a subgrain as more dislocations move into the dislocation wall (a zone of dislocations resulting from climb, cross-slip, and glide), which increases the crystallographic mismatch across the boundary. Eventually, the misorientation across the boundary is sufficiently large enough to recognize individual grains (usually 10–15° misorientation). Grains tend to be elongate or ribbon-shape, with many subgrains, with a characteristic gradual transition from low-angle subgrains to high-angle boundaries.
2. Migration recrystallization (grain-boundary migration) is the processes by which a grain grows at the expense of the neighboring grains. At low temperatures, the mobility of the grain boundary may be local, and the grain boundary may bulge into a neighboring grain with a high dislocation density and form new, smaller, independent crystals by a process called low-temperature grain boundary migration, or bulging recrystallization. The bulges produced can separate from the original grain to form new grains by the formation of subgrain (low-angle) boundaries, which can evolve into grain boundaries, or by migration of the grain boundary. Bulging recrystallization often occurs along boundaries of old grains at triple junctions. At high temperatures, the growing grain has a lower dislocation density than the grain(s) consumed, and the grain boundary sweeps through the neighboring grains to remove dislocations by high-temperature grain-boundary migration crystallization. Grain boundaries are lobate with a variable grain size, with new grains generally larger than existing subgrains. At very high temperatures, grains are highly lobate or ameboid, but can be nearly strain-free.

== Deformation mechanism map ==
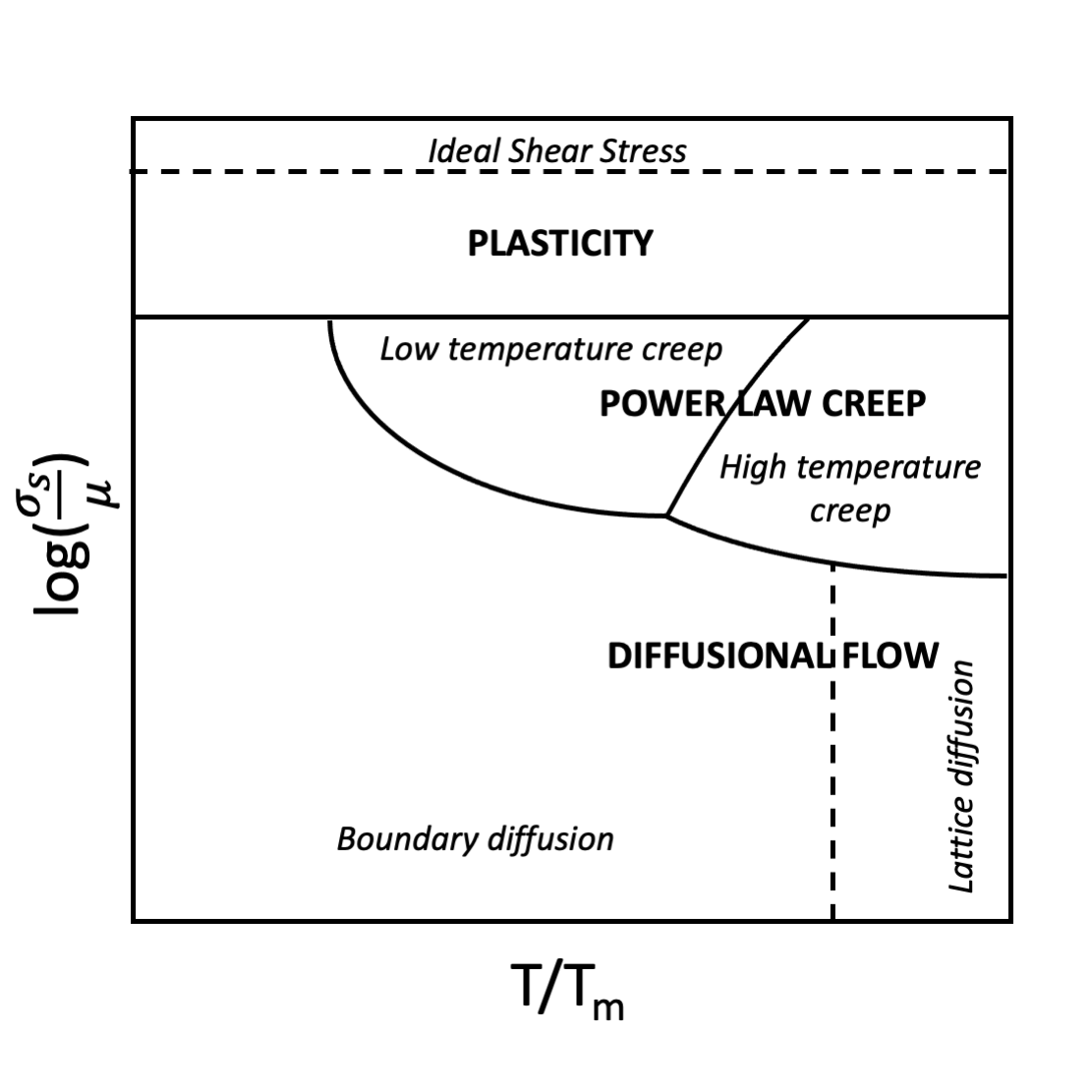
Sample deformation mechanism map for a hypothetical material. Here there are three main regions: plasticity, power law creep, and diffusional flow.

A deformation mechanism map is a way of representing the dominant deformation mechanism in a material loaded under a given set of conditions. The technique is applicable to all crystalline materials, metallurgical as well as geological. Additionally, work has been conducted regarding the use of deformation maps to nanostructured or very fine grain materials. Deformation mechanism maps usually consist of some kind of stress plotted against some kind of temperature axis, typically stress normalized using the shear modulus versus homologous temperature with contours of strain rate. The normalized shear stress is plotted on a log scale. While plots of normalized shear stress vs. homologous temperature are most common, other forms of deformation mechanism maps include shear strain rate vs. normalized shear stress and shear strain rate vs. homologous temperature. Thus deformation maps can be constructed using any two of stress (normalized), temperature (normalized), and strain rate, with contours of the third variable. A stress/strain rate plot is useful because power-law mechanisms then have contours of temperature which are straight lines.

For a given set of operating conditions, calculations are conducted and experiments performed to determine the predominant mechanism operative for a given material. Constitutive equations for the type of mechanism have been developed for each deformation mechanism and are used in the construction of the maps. The theoretical shear strength of the material is independent of temperature and located along the top of the map, with the regimes of plastic deformation mechanisms below it. Constant strain rate contours can be constructed on the maps using the constitutive equations of the deformation mechanisms which makes the maps extremely useful.

=== Process maps ===
The same technique has been used to construct process maps for sintering, diffusion bonding, hot isostatic pressing, and indentation.

=== Construction ===
Repeated experiments are performed to characterize the mechanism by which the material deforms. The dominant mechanism is the one which dominates the continuous deformation rate (strain rate), however at any given level of stress and temperature, more than one of the creep and plasticity mechanisms may be active. The boundaries between the fields are determined from the constitutive equations of the deformation mechanisms by solving for stress as a function of temperature. Along these boundaries, the deformation rates for the two neighboring mechanisms are equal. The programming code used for many of the published maps is open source and an archive of its development is online. Many researchers have also written their own codes to make these maps.

The main regions in a typical deformation mechanism map and their constitutive equations are shown in the following subsections.

==== Plasticity region ====
The plasticity region is at the top of deformation map (at the highest normalized stresses), and is below the boundary set by the ideal strength. In this region the strain rate involves an exponential term. This equation is shown below, where $\sigma_s$ is the applied shear stress, $\mu$ is the shear modulus, $\Delta E$ is the energy barrier to dislocation glide, k is the Boltzmann constant, and $\widehat{\tau}$ is the "athermal flow strength" which is a function of the obstacles to dislocation glide.

$\dot{\gamma}\propto (\frac{\sigma_s}{\mu})^2 \exp[-\frac{\Delta E}{kT}(1-\frac{\sigma_s}{\widehat{\tau}})]$

==== Power Law creep region ====
In this region, the dominant deformation mechanism is power law creep, such that the strain rate goes as the stress raised to a stress exponent n. This region is dominated by dislocation creep. The value of this stress exponent is dependent upon the material and the microstructure. If deformation is occurring by slip, n=1-8, and for grain boundary sliding n=2 or 4.

The general equation for power law creep is as follows, where $A_2$ is a dimensionless constant relating shear strain rate and stress, μ is the shear modulus, b is the Burger's vector, k is the Boltzmann constant, T is the temperature, n is the stress exponent, $\sigma_s$ is the applied shear stress, and $D_{eff}$ is the effective diffusion constant.

$\dot{\gamma}= \frac{A_2D_{eff}\mu b}{kT}(\frac{\sigma_s}{\mu})^n$

Within the power law creep region, there are two subsections corresponding to low temperature power law creep that is dominated by core controlled dislocation motion and high temperature power law creep that is controlled by diffusion in the lattice. Low temperature core diffusion, sometimes called pipe diffusion, occurs because dislocations are more quickly able to diffuse through the pipe-like core of a dislocation. The effective diffusion coefficient in the strain rate equation depends on whether or not the system is dominated by core diffusion or lattice diffusion and can be generalized as follows where $D_v$ is the volumetric lattice diffusion constant, $a_c$ is the area corresponding to the dislocation core, $D_c$ is the diffusion coefficient for the core, and b is the Burger's vector.

$D_{eff}= D_v +10(\frac{\sigma_s}{\mu})^2\frac{a_cD_c}{b^2}$

In the high temperature region, the effective diffusion constant is simply the volumetric lattice diffusion constant, whereas at low temperatures the diffusion constant is given by the expression $10(\frac{\sigma_s}{\mu})^2\frac{a_cD_c}{b^2}$. Thus in the high temperature power law creep region, the strain rate goes as $(\frac{\sigma_s}{\mu})^n$, and in the low temperature power law creep region the strain rate goes as $(\frac{\sigma_s}{\mu})^{n+2}$.

==== Diffusional flow region ====
Diffusional flow is a regime typically below dislocation creep and occurs at high temperatures due to the diffusion of point defects in the material. Diffusional flow can be further broken down into more specific mechanisms: Nabarro–Herring creep, Coble creep, and Harper–Dorn creep.

While most materials will exhibit Nabarro-Herring creep and Coble creep, Harper-Dorn creep is quite rare, having only been reported in a select few materials at low stresses including aluminium, lead, and tin.

The equation for Nabarro-Herring creep is dominated by vacancy diffusion within the lattice, whereas Coble creep is dominated by vacancy diffusion within the grain boundaries. The equation for these mechanisms is shown below where $\sigma_s$ is the applied shear stress, Ω is the atomic volume, k is the Boltzmann constant ,d is the grain size, T is the temperature, and $D_{eff}$ is the effective diffusion coefficient.

$\dot{\gamma}= \alpha'' \frac{D_{eff}}{d^2}\frac{\Omega\sigma}{kT}$

The effective diffusion coefficient, $D_{eff}$= $D_v$ (the volumetric diffusion constant) for Nabarro-Herring creep which dominates at high temperatures, and $D_{eff}=\frac{\pi\delta}{d}D_b$ (where $\delta$ is the grain boundary width and $D_b$ is the diffusion coefficient in the boundary) for Coble creep which dominates at low-temperatures.

From these equations it becomes clear that the boundary between boundary diffusion and lattice diffusion is heavily dependent on grain size. For systems with larger grains, the Nabarro-Herring lattice diffusion region of the deformation mechanism map will be larger than in maps with very small grains. Additionally, the larger the grains, the less diffusional creep and thus the power-law creep region of the map will be larger for large grained materials. Grain boundary engineering is thus an effective strategy to manipulate creep rates.

=== Reading ===
For a given stress profile and temperature, the point lies in a particular "deformation field". If the values place the point near the center of a field, it is likely that the primary mechanism by which the material will fail, i.e.: the type and rate of failure expected, grain boundary diffusion, plasticity, Nabarro–Herring creep, etc. If however, the stress and temperature conditions place the point near the boundary between two deformation mechanism regions then the dominating mechanism is less clear. Near the boundary of the regimes there can be a combination of mechanisms of deformation occurring simultaneously. Deformation mechanism maps are only as accurate as the number of experiments and calculations undertaken in their creation.

For a given stress and temperature, the strain rate and deformation mechanism of a material is given by a point on the map. By comparing maps of various materials, crystal structures, bonds, grain sizes, etc., studies of these materials properties on plastic flow can be conducted and a more complete understanding of deformation in materials is obtained.

=== Examples ===
Above the theoretical shear strength of the material, a type of defect-less flow can still occur, shearing the material. Dislocation motion through glide (any temperature) or dislocation creep (at high temperatures) is a typical mechanism found at high stresses in deformation maps.

=== Deformation Mechanisms in Polymers ===
Polymer melts exhibit different deformation mechanisms when subjected to shear or tensile stresses. For example, a polymer melt’s ductility can increase when a stimulus, such as light, causes fragmentation of the polymer chains through bond breaking. This process is known as chain scission. In the low temperature regime of a polymer melt (T < Tg), crazing or shear banding can occur. The former mechanism resembles crack formation, but this deformation mechanism actually involves the formation of fibrils separated by porous domains or voids. The latter mechanism (shear banding) involves the formation of localized regions of plastic deformation, which typically arise near the position of the maximal shear point in a polymer melt. Crazing and shear banding are deformation mechanisms observed in glassy polymers.

For crystalline polymers, the deformation mechanism is best described by a stress-strain curve for a crystalline polymer, such as nylon. The stress-strain behavior exhibits four characteristic regions. The first region is the linear-elastic regime, where the stress-strain behavior is elastic with no plastic deformation. The characteristic deformation mechanism in the second region is yielding, where plastic deformation can occur in the form phenomena such as twinning. The third region shows the formation of a neck, and the fourth region is characterized as a steep increase in stress due to viscous flow. Additionally, region four corresponds to alignment and elongation of the polymer backbone from its coiled or folded state—eventually leading to fracture.
