= Microstructurally stable nanocrystalline alloys =

Microstructurally stable nanocrystalline alloys are alloys that are designed to resist microstructural coarsening under various thermo-mechanical loading conditions.

Many applications of metal materials require that they can maintain their structure and strength despite very high temperatures. Efforts to prevent deformations from long term stress, referred to as creep, consist of manipulating alloys to reduce coarsening and migration of individual grains within the metal.

The small size of individual metal grains provides high interfacial surface energy which is what prompts coarsening, the increase in grain size, and eventually metallic softening. Nanocrystalline creep is considered to follow the Coble creep mechanism, the diffusion of atoms along grain boundaries at low stress levels and high temperatures. One method used to reduce coarsening, is by employing an alloy in which one component has good solubility with another. Since grain size decreases with high solute concentration, the rate of coarsening is slowed until inconsequential.

== Copper and 10% atomic tantalum nanocrystalline alloy ==
In 2016, researchers at the Arizona State University and the United States Army Research Laboratory reported a microstructurally stable nanocrystalline alloy made of copper and 10% atomic tantalum (Cu–10 at% Ta). This microstructurally stable nanocrystalline alloy demonstrated high creep resistance under an applied stress and temperature ranges 0.85 to 1.2% of the shear modulus and .5-.64Tm respectively, the steady creep rates were consistently less than 10^{−6} s^{−1}.

This stability was credited to the mechanistic creep process and the alloy’s core–shell-type structures. The scientists determined that the copper alloy creep occurred in dislocation climb areas under levels of relatively larger stress, claiming that any diffusion creep occurring was negligible. The core–shell-type nanostructures prevented coarsening by securing grain boundaries, a mechanism known as Zener pinning. In these structures more interfacial bonding interactions were possible, increasing strength. Oxide-dispersion strengthened (ODS) ferritic alloys16 and molybdenum alloys17’s great strength and ductility were also credited to these nanostructures.

== Nickel and 13% tungsten nanocrystalline alloy ==
In 2007, a nickel (Ni) and tungsten (W) nanocrystalline alloy was reported to have resistance to coarsening. Experimental data reported that the alloy coarsened to 28 nm from its original grain size of 20 nm after 30 minutes of exposure to heat of 600 degrees Celsius. This growth was then compared to the coarsening rate of an individual grain of Ni placed in heat of 300 degrees Celsius for 30 minutes.

== Tungsten and 20% titanium nanocrystalline alloy ==
In 2012, a tungsten (W) and 20% titanium (Ti) nanocrystalline alloy after a week of exposure to heat of 1100 degrees Celsius in an argon atmosphere was claimed by the researchers to have displayed no change in grain size from the initial 20 nm. Meanwhile, the unalloyed W under the same conditions exhibited a final size on the micrometer scale. Another reviewer describes the coarsening of the W-Ti alloy to be a 2 nm size increase from the original 22 nm. The authors attribute the microstructural stability to a complex chemical arrangement. The nanocrystalline metallic grains were made via a high-energy ball mill method.
