= Diffusion creep =

Diffusion creep refers to the deformation of crystalline solids by the diffusion of vacancies through their crystal lattice. Diffusion creep results in plastic deformation rather than brittle failure of the material.

Diffusion creep is more sensitive to temperature than other deformation mechanisms. It becomes especially relevant at high homologous temperatures (i.e. within about a tenth of its absolute melting temperature). Diffusion creep is caused by the migration of crystalline defects through the lattice of a crystal such that when a crystal is subjected to a greater degree of compression in one direction relative to another, defects migrate to the crystal faces along the direction of compression, causing a net mass transfer that shortens the crystal in the direction of maximum compression. The migration of defects is in part due to vacancies, whose migration is equal to a net mass transport in the opposite direction.

== Principle ==
Crystalline materials are never perfect on a microscale. Some sites of atoms in the crystal lattice can be occupied by point defects, such as "alien" particles or vacancies. Vacancies can actually be thought of as chemical species themselves (or part of a compound species/component) that may then be treated using heterogeneous phase equilibria. The number of vacancies may also be influenced by the number of chemical impurities in the crystal lattice, if such impurities require the formation of vacancies to exist in the lattice.

A vacancy can move through the crystal structure when the neighbouring particle "jumps" in the vacancy, so that the vacancy moves in effect one site in the crystal lattice. Chemical bonds need to be broken and new bonds have to be formed during the process, therefore a certain activation energy is needed. Moving a vacancy through a crystal becomes therefore easier when the temperature is higher.

The most stable state will be when all vacancies are evenly spread through the crystal. This principle follows from Fick's law:

$$J_x = -D_x \frac{\Delta C}{\Delta x}$$

In which J_{x} stands for the flux ("flow") of vacancies in direction x; D_{x} is a constant for the material in that direction and ${\Delta C}/{\Delta x}$ is the difference in concentration of vacancies in that direction. The law is valid for all principal directions in (x, y, z)-space, so the x in the formula can be exchanged for y or z. The result will be that they will become evenly distributed over the crystal, which will result in the highest mixing entropy.

When a mechanical stress is applied to the crystal, new vacancies will be created at the sides perpendicular to the direction of the lowest principal stress. The vacancies will start moving in the direction of crystal planes perpendicular to the maximal stress. Current theory holds that the elastic strain in the neighborhood of a defect is smaller toward the axis of greatest differential compression, creating a defect chemical potential gradient (depending upon lattice strain) within the crystal that leads to net accumulation of defects at the faces of maximum compression by diffusion. A flow of vacancies is the same as a flow of particles in the opposite direction. This means a crystalline material can deform under a differential stress, by the flow of vacancies.

Highly mobile chemical components substituting for other species in the lattice can also cause a net differential mass transfer (i.e. segregation) of chemical species inside the crystal itself, often promoting shortening of the rheologically more difficult substance and enhancing deformation.

== Types of diffusion creep ==
Diffusion of vacancies through a crystal can happen in a number of ways. When vacancies move through the crystal (in the material sciences often called a "grain"), this is called Nabarro–Herring creep. Another way in which vacancies can move is along the grain boundaries, a mechanism called Coble creep.

When a crystal deforms by diffusion creep to accommodate space problems from simultaneous grain boundary sliding (the movement of whole grains along grain boundaries) this is called granular or superplastic flow. Diffusion creep can also be simultaneous with pressure solution. Pressure solution is, like Coble creep, a mechanism in which material moves along grain boundaries. While in Coble creep the particles move by "dry" diffusion, in pressure solution they move in solution.

== Flow laws ==
Each plastic deformation of a material can be described by a formula in which the strain rate ($\dot{\epsilon}$) depends on the differential stress (σ or σ_{D}), the grain size (d) and an activation value in the form of an Arrhenius equation:

$\!\dot{\epsilon} = Ae^\frac{-Q}{RT} \frac{\sigma^n}{d^m}$

In which A is the constant of diffusion, Q the activation energy of the mechanism, R the gas constant and T the absolute temperature (in kelvins). The exponents n and m are values for the sensitivity of the flow to stress and grain size respectively. The values of A, Q, n and m are different for each deformation mechanism. For diffusion creep, the value of n is usually around 1. The value for m can vary between 2 (Nabarro-Herring creep) and 3 (Coble creep). That means Coble creep is more sensitive to grain size of a material: materials with larger grains can deform less easily by Coble creep than materials with small grains.

== Grain Size Effects on Diffusional Creep ==
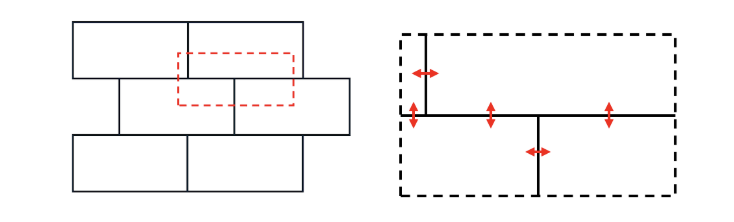
2D unit cell for shifted rectangular grains outlined in red (left) with the isolated unit cell and grain boundary diffusion schematic (right)

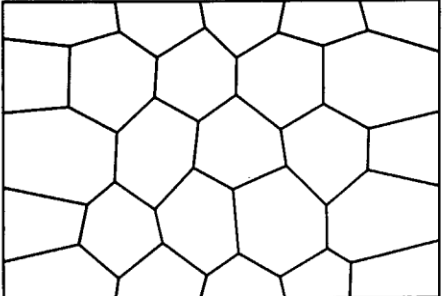
Irregular grain geometries and sizes with nodes connected by three lines segments

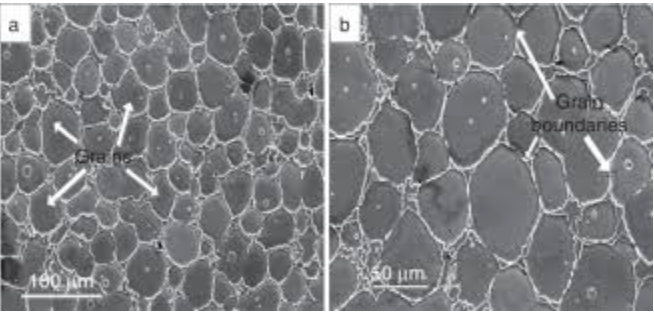
Grain Boundaries from a scanning electron microscope (SEM)

In early models of creep developed in the 1950s and 1960s, grain size was approximated by treating grains as spheres with an average diameter d. However, real materials exhibit a range of grain shapes and sizes that cannot be adequately described by a single variable. During the 1980s, researchers at the Massachusetts Institute of Technology introduced simplified two-dimensional geometric models—such as hexagonal, square, and rectangular grains—to investigate the influence of grain geometry on diffusional creep.

By applying Fick’s law of diffusion to the flux of vacancies across grain boundaries, the net vacancy flux within a unit can be quantified and tessellated to represent the entire volume. Variations of these 2D geometries demonstrated that the diffusional creep equation includes a geometric factor A, which ranges between 7 and 30 depending on the assumed grain shape. This indicates that grain geometry can significantly influence the magnitude of the strain rate and should be considered in cases involving dynamic recrystallization or grain growth, where grain shapes and sizes evolve during deformation.

Subsequent studies extended this approach to irregular grain geometries, developing a general framework for determining A for grains connected by three-line nodes. More recent models incorporate grain size distributions and nodal connectivity from experimental evidence such as those collected by scanning electron microscopes, allowing for the determination of average A values that more accurately represent the heterogeneous microstructure of polycrystalline materials. These modern approaches are commonly implemented in computational models of creep deformation, such as finite element simulations, to predict long-term performance of polycrystalline materials under high-temperature conditions. For example, Nassif et al. (2019) developed a mesoscale finite-element model that explicitly represents grain and grain-boundary geometry within a polycrystalline structure, coupling dislocation motion inside grains with grain-boundary diffusion and cavity growth to simulate creep rupture behaviour at elevated temperature.

== Traces of diffusion creep ==
It is difficult to find clear microscale evidence for diffusion creep in a crystalline material, since few structures have been identified as definite proof. A material that was deformed by diffusion creep can have flattened grains (grains with a so called shape-preferred orientation or SPO). Equidimensional grains with no lattice-preferred orientation (or LPO) can be an indication for superplastic flow. In materials that were deformed under very high temperatures, lobate grain boundaries may be taken as evidence for diffusion creep.

Diffusion creep is a mechanism by which the volume of the crystals can increase. Larger grain sizes can be a sign that diffusion creep was more effective in a crystalline material.

== See also ==
- Creep (deformation)
- Deformation (engineering)
- Diffusion
- Dislocation creep
- Material sciences
