= Grain boundary sliding =

Material deformation mechanism

Grain boundary sliding (GBS) is a material deformation mechanism where grains slide against each other. This occurs in polycrystalline material under external stress at high homologous temperature (above ~0.4) and low strain rate and is intertwined with creep. Homologous temperature describes the operating temperature relative to the melting temperature of the material. There are mainly two types of grain boundary sliding: Rachinger sliding, and Lifshitz sliding. Grain boundary sliding usually occurs as a combination of both types of sliding. Boundary shape often determines the rate and extent of grain boundary sliding.

A simple schematic of grain boundary sliding in a polycrystalline sample (adapted from). When a tensile load is applied to the materials, the grains stretch along that direction. This leads to the creation of voids/cavities and a loss of coherency. To prevent void formation, the grains slide relative to each other to fill in these unfavorable gaps.

Grain boundary sliding is a motion to prevent intergranular cracks from forming. Keep in mind that at high temperatures, many processes are underway, and grain boundary sliding is only one of the processes happening. Therefore it is not surprising that Nabarro Herring and Coble creep is dependent on grain boundary sliding. During high temperature creep, wavy grain boundaries are often observed. We can simulate this type of boundary with a sinusoidal curve, with amplitude h and wavelength λ. Steady-state creep rate increases with rising λ/h ratios. At high λ and high homologous temperatures, grain boundary sliding is controlled by lattice diffusion (Nabarro-Herring mechanism). On the other hand, it will be controlled by grain boundary diffusion (Coble Creep). Additionally, when λ/h ratios are high, it may impede diffusional flow, therefore diffusional voids may form, which leads to fracture in creep.

Many people have developed estimations for the contribution of grain boundary sliding to the total strain experienced by various groups of materials, such as metals, ceramics, and geological materials. Grain boundary sliding contributes a significant amount of strain, especially for fine grain materials and high temperatures. It has been shown that Lifshitz grain boundary sliding contributes about 50-60% of strain in Nabarro–Herring diffusion creep. This mechanism is the primary cause of ceramic failure at high temperatures due to the formation of glassy phases at their grain boundaries.

== Rachinger sliding ==
Rachinger sliding is purely elastic; the grains retain most of their original shape. The internal stress will build up as grains slide until the stress balances out with the external applied stress. For example, when a uniaxial tensile stress is applied on a sample, grains move to accommodate the elongation and the number of grains along the direction of applied stress increases.

== Lifshitz sliding ==
Lifshitz sliding only occurs with Nabarro–Herring and Coble creep. The sliding motion is accommodated by the diffusion of vacancies from induced stresses and the grain shape changes during the process. For example, when a uniaxial tensile stress is applied, diffusion will occur within grains and the grain will elongate in the same direction as the applied stress. There will not be an increase in number of grains along the direction of applied stress.

== Accommodation mechanisms ==
When polycrystalline grains slide relative to each other, there must be simultaneous mechanisms that allow for this sliding to occur without the overlapping of grains (which would be physically impossible). Various accommodation mechanisms have been proposed to account for this issue.

- Dislocation movement: Dislocations can move through the material by processes such as climb and glide to allow for compatibility
- Elastic distortion: When the sliding distance is small, the grains can deform elastically (and sometimes recoverably) to allow for compatibility
- Diffusional accommodation: Using diffusional creep mechanisms, the material can diffuse along grain boundaries or through grains to allow for compatibility

Grain boundary sliding accommodated by diffusional flow:

Grain boundary sliding accommodated by diffusional flow takes place by grain-switching while preserving grain shape. This type of mechanism is synonymous to Nabarro Herring and Coble creep but describes the grain at superplastic conditions. This concept was originally proposed by Ashby and Verral. During grain switching, we can describe the process through three steps: a) Initial state b) Intermediate stage c) Final state. During the intermediate stage, there must first be an applied stress exceeding the “threshold” stress so that there is an increase in grain boundary area which is provided by the diffusional flow that occurs once the threshold stress is achieved. Under the assumption that the applied stress is much greater than the threshold stress, the strain rate is greater than conventional diffusional creep. The reason for this is that for grain switching diffusion, the distance is about 1/7 the distance of diffusional creep and there are two more paths to grain switching in comparison with diffusional creep. Thus, this will lead to about an order magnitude higher strain rate than diffusional creep.

Grain boundary sliding accommodated by dislocation flow:

At superplastic temperature, strain rate and stress conditions, dislocations are rarely observed because they are quickly emitted and absorbed at grain boundaries. However, careful studies have been conducted to verify that dislocations are indeed emitted during superplastic deformation. During dislocation flow, the shape of the grain must be ensured to not change. Based on models of super plasticity, transitioning from dislocation creep to super plasticity occurs when the sub grain size is less than the grain size. The sub grain size: often denoted as d’ can be described in the equation below:

${d'\over b} = {10G\over \tau}$,

Where it has an inverse relationship with shear stress.

== Deformation rate from grain boundary sliding ==
Generally speaking, the minimum creep rate for diffusion can be expressed as:

$$\dot{\epsilon}_s=\frac{ADGb}{kT}\left(\frac{b}{d}\right)^p\left(\frac{\sigma}{G}\right)^n$$

where the terms are defined as follows:

- $\dot{\epsilon}_s$ = minimum creep rate
- $A$ = constant
- $D$ = diffusion coefficient
- $b$ = Burgers vector
- $k$ = Boltzmann constant
- $T$ = temperature
- $d$ = mean grain size
- $\sigma$ = stress
- $G$ = shear modulus
- $p,n$ = exponents that depend on the creep mechanism

In the case where this minimum creep rate is controlled by grain boundary sliding, the exponents become $p=1$, $n=2$, and the diffusion coefficient $D$ becomes $D_L$ (the lattice diffusion coefficient). Thus, the minimum creep rate becomes:

$$\dot{\epsilon}_s=\frac{AD_LGb}{kT}\left(\frac{b}{d}\right)\left(\frac{\sigma}{G}\right)^2$$

== Estimating the contribution of GBS to the overall Strain ==
The total strain under creep conditions can be denoted as εt, where:

_{$\epsilon_{t}=\epsilon_{g}+\epsilon_{gbs}+\epsilon_{dc}$}

_{$\epsilon_{g}$} = Strain associated with intragranular dislocation processes

_{$\epsilon_{gbs}$} = Strain due to Rachinger GBS associated with intragranular sliding

_{$\epsilon_{dc}$} = Strain due to Lifshitz GBS associated with diffusion creep

During practice, experiments are normally performed in conditions where creep is negligible, therefore equation 1 will reduce to:

_{$\epsilon_{t}=\epsilon_{g}+\epsilon_{gbs}$}

Therefore the contribution of GBS to the total strain can be denoted as:

_{$\xi={\epsilon_{gbs}\over \epsilon_{g}}$}

First, we need to illustrate the three perpendicular displacement vectors: _{$u$}, _{$v$}, and _{$w$}, with a grain boundary sliding vector: s. It can be imagined as the _{$w$} displacement vector coming out of the plane. While the _{$v$} and _{$u$} vectors are in the plane. The displacement vector u is also the tensile stress direction. The sliding contribution may be estimated by individual measurements of εgbs through these displacement vectors. We can further define the angle at the _{$uv$} plane of displacements as _{$\Psi$}, and the angle between the _{$uw$} planes as _{$\Theta$}. _{$u$} can then be related by the tangents of these angles through the equation:

_{$u=v \tan\Psi +w \tan\Theta$}

A common and easier way in practice is to use interferometry to measure fringes along the v displacement axis. The sliding strain is then given by:

_{$\epsilon_{gbs} =k'' n_r v_r$}

Where _{$k''$} is constant, _{$n_r$} is the number of measurements, and _{$v_r$} is the average of n measurements.

Thus we can calculate the percentage of GBS strain.

== Experimental evidence ==
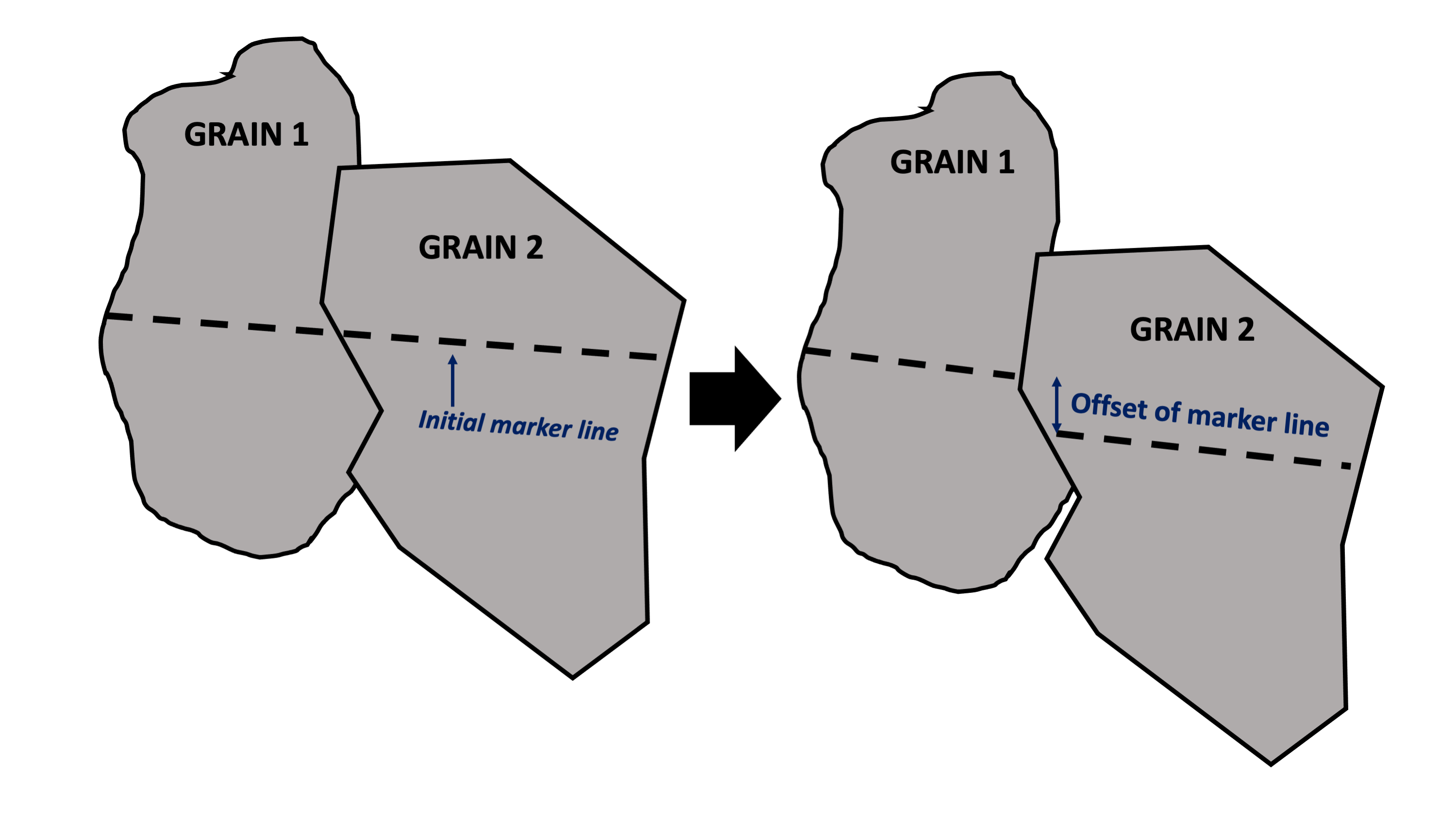
A simple schematic showing how experimentalists observe grain boundary sliding between two adjacent grains. Initially, a polycrystalline material is scratched with a marker line (shown here as a thick dashed line). If these two grains slide relative to one another, there will be an offset in this marker line occurring at the grain boundary. This can be observed using various microscopy techniques.

Grain boundary scattering has been observed experimentally using various microscopy techniques. It was first observed in NaCl and MgO bicrystals in 1962 by Adams and Murray. By scratching the surface of their samples with a marker line, they were able to observe an offset of that line at the grain boundary as a result of adjacent grains sliding with respect to each other. Subsequently this was observed in other systems as well including in Zn-Al alloys using electron microscopy, and octachloropropane using in situ techniques.

== Nanomaterials ==
Nano-crystalline materials, or nanomaterials, have fine grains which helps suppress lattice creep. This is beneficial for relatively low temperature operations as it impedes dislocations motion or diffusion due to high volume fraction of grain boundaries. However, fine grains are undesirable at high temperature due to the increased probability of grain boundary sliding.

== Prevention ==
Grain shape plays a large role in determining the sliding rate and extent. Thus, by controlling the grain size and shape, the amount of grain boundary sliding can be limited. Generally, materials with coarser grains are preferred, as the material will have less grain boundaries. Ideally, single crystals will completely suppress this mechanism as the sample will not have any grain boundaries.

Another method is to reinforce grain boundaries by adding precipitates. Small precipitates located at grain boundaries can pin grain boundaries and prevent grains from sliding against each other. However, not all precipitates are desirable at boundaries. Large precipitates may have the opposite effect on grain boundary pinning as it allows more gaps or vacancies between grains to accommodate the precipitates, which reduces the pinning effect.

== Modeling effects of GBS in high strength steel ==
The application of high-strength steel is ubiquitous in the engineering world today. To provide a standard engineering basis for real-world construction, the modeling of high-strength steel is important.

By inputting parameters such as elastic modulus, yield strength, Poisson’s ratio, and specific heat of high strength steel from two temperatures, we can derive the related GBS energy as a function of temperature and thus its yield strength as a function of temperature.

== Experimental Study: Superplastic Forming Technique via GBS ==
The superplastic forming technique is a technique where materials are deformed beyond the yield stress to form a complex shaped lightweight construction. This phenomenon is possible through grain boundary sliding that is enabled by dislocation slip/creep and diffusional creep.

An example would be for commercial fine-grained Al-Mg alloys, unusually weak grain boundary sliding is observed during the initial stage of superplastic deformation. Through a tensile test, grains were elongated along the tensile direction to 50~70%. The deformation was orchestrated by increased precipitation depletion zone fractions, particle segregation on the longitudinal grain boundaries, dislocation activity, and subgrains. Increased Mg content leads to increased GBS. Increasing Mg content from 4.8 to 6.5~7.6% aids grain size stability during the increased temperature process, simplified the GBS and decreased diffusion creep contribution, and increased the failure strain from 300% to 430%.

== Application to tungsten filaments ==
The operation temperature for tungsten filaments used in incandescent lightbulbs is around 2000K to 3200K which is near the melting point of tungsten (T_{m} = 3695 K). As lightbulbs are expected to operate for long periods of time at a homologous temperature up to 0.8, understanding and preventing creep mechanism is crucial to extending their life expectancy.

Researchers found that the predominant mechanism for failure in these tungsten filaments was grain boundary sliding accommodated by diffusional creep. This is because tungsten filaments, being as thin as they are, typically consist of only a handful of elongated grains. In fact there is usually less than one grain boundary per turn in a tungsten coil. This elongated grain structure is generally called a bamboo structure, as the grains look similar to the internodes of bamboo stalks. During operation, the tungsten wire is stressed under the load of its own weight and because of the diffusion that can occur at high temperatures, grains begin to rotate and slide. This stress, because of variations in the filament, causes the filament to sag nonuniformly, which ultimately introduces further torque on the filament. It is this sagging that inevitably results in a rupture of the filament, rendering the incandescent lightbulb useless. The typical lifetime for these single coil filaments is approximately 440 hours.

To combat this grain boundary sliding, researchers began to dope the tungsten filament with aluminum, silicon and most importantly potassium. This composite material (AKS tungsten) is unique as it is composed of potassium and tungsten, which are non-alloying. This feature of potassium results in nanosized bubbles of either liquid or gaseous potassium being distributed throughout the filament after proper manufacturing. These bubbles interact with all defects in the filament pinning dislocations and most importantly grain boundaries. Pinning these grain boundaries, even at high temperatures, drastically reduces grain boundary sliding. This reduction in grain boundary sliding earned these filaments the title of "non-sag filaments" as they would no longer bow under their own weight. Thus, this initially counter-intuitive approach to strengthening tungsten filaments began to be widely used in almost every incandescent lightbulb to greatly increase their lifetime.
