= Homologous temperature =

Fraction of the melting point

Graph of homologous temperatures of water, lead, aluminum, and iron

In materials science, homologous temperature is the ratio between the absolute temperature of a material and its melting point. Homologous temperature is typically denoted by $T_H$, but is also frequently expressed in terms of the melting point, $T_m$.

The formula is

$T_H = \frac{T}{T_{m}}$,

where

$T$ is absolute temperature (K),
$T_m$ is the melting point of the material (K).

For example, lead ($T_m$= 601 K) has a homologous temperature of approximately 0.5 at room temperature (298 K).

Homologous temperature is used for materials when they are below their melting points, and thus it is limited to values between 0 and 1. Furthermore, because it is measured in SI base units of kelvin per kelvin, (K/K), homologous temperature is dimensionless and can be understood as a fraction or percentage.

== Significance of the homologous temperature ==
The homologous temperature of a substance is useful because it normalizes temperature values and provides a metric by which materials with different melting points can be compared. Thus, homologous temperature may be useful for describing many thermally activated processes. Some examples include creep, self-diffusion, superplasticity, grain boundary sliding, and recrystallization (which is also utilized to distinguish between hot work and cold work). However, material systems with different microstructures (such as metals and ceramics) can not be directly compared using homologous temperature, as many temperature-related effects are dependent on the type of chemical bond.

In the case of the thermally activated process of steady-state creep, deformation rates are generally understood to become significant at homologous temperatures above approximately 0.4. For example, at 150 °C, aluminum and iron have homologous temperatures of approximately 0.45 and 0.23, respectively. Therefore, aluminum at this temperature may creep, while iron will not. As homologous temperature increases beyond 0.4, diffusion dependent deformation rates begin to increase exponentially, and this can lead to the failure of mechanical parts. This concept may be applied to other branches of science, such as geology. For instance, most of Earth's glaciers have homologous temperatures greater than 0.9, and are known to creep.

Deformation mechanism maps, proposed by Michael Ashby in 1972, use homologous temperature and normalized stress to show which creep mechanism dominates for a given set of conditions. At higher homologous temperatures, for example, Nabarro–Herring creep becomes more significant than Coble creep, as Coble creep relies on grain boundary diffusion, which is favored at lower temperatures.
