= Larson–Miller relation =

Equation in materials science engineering

The Larson–Miller relation, also widely known as the Larson–Miller parameter and often abbreviated LMP, is a parametric relation used to extrapolate experimental data on creep and rupture life of engineering materials.

== Background and usage ==
F.R. Larson and J. Miller proposed that creep rate could adequately be described by the Arrhenius type equation:

$$r = A \cdot e^{-\Delta H/(R \cdot T)}$$

Where r is the creep process rate, A is a constant, R is the universal gas constant, T is the absolute temperature, and $\Delta H$ is the activation energy for the creep process. Taking the natural log of both sides:

$$\ln(r) = \ln(A) - \Delta H/(R \cdot T)$$

With some rearrangement:

$$\Delta H/R = T \cdot (\ln(A) - \ln(r))$$

Using the fact that creep rate is inversely proportional to time, the equation can be written as:

$$\Delta l/\Delta t = A' \cdot e^{-\Delta H/ ( R \cdot T )}$$

Taking the natural log:

$$\ln(\Delta l/\Delta t) = \ln(A') - \Delta H/(R \cdot T)$$

After some rearrangement the relation finally becomes:

$\Delta H/R = T \cdot (B + \ln(\Delta t))$, where B = $\ln(A'/\Delta l)$

This equation is of the same form as the Larson–Miller relation.

$$LMP = T \cdot (C + \log(t))$$

where the quantity LMP is known as the Larson–Miller parameter. Using the assumption that activation energy is independent of applied stress, the equation can be used to relate the difference in rupture life to differences in temperature for a given stress. The material constant C is typically found to be in the range of 20 to 22 for metals when time is expressed in hours and temperature in degrees Rankine.

The Larson–Miller model is used for experimental tests so that results at certain temperatures and stresses can predict rupture lives of time spans that would be impractical to reproduce in the laboratory.

Expanding the equation as a Taylor series makes the relationship easier to understand. Only the first terms are kept.

$$\Delta LMP = \frac{\partial LMP}{\partial T} \cdot \Delta T + \frac{\partial LMP}{\partial \log(t)} \cdot \Delta log(t) +\cdots$$
$$\frac{\partial LMP}{\partial T} = 20 + \log(t) \qquad \qquad \frac{\partial LMP}{\partial \log(t)} = T$$

Changing the time, by a factor of 10, changes the logarithm by 1 and the LMP changes by an amount equal to the temperature.

$$\Delta LMP = \frac{\partial LMP}{\partial \log(t)} \cdot \Delta \log(t) = T \cdot \Delta \log(t) = T \cdot 1 = T$$

To get an equal change in LMP by changing the temperature, the temperature needs to be raised or lowered by about 5% of its absolute value.

$$\Delta LMP = T = \frac{\partial LMP}{\partial T} \cdot \Delta T \qquad \Delta T = \frac{\Delta LMP}{\frac{\partial LMP}{\partial T}} = \frac{T}{(20+\log(t))} \approx \frac{T}{20} =5\% T$$

Typically a 5% increase in absolute temperature will increase the rate of creep by a factor of ten.

The equation was developed during the 1950s while Miller and Larson were employed by GE performing research on turbine blade life.

== MPC project Omega ==
The Omega Method is a comprehensive approach developed for assessing the remaining life of components operating in the creep range. Unlike other methods such as replication, life summation based on Larson-Miller parameters, or Kachanov's approach.

The Omega Method aims to overcome limitations in accurately estimating strain accumulation, damage, and the rate of damage accumulation. It provides a broader methodology for life assessment that incorporates strain-rate parameters, multi-axial damage parameters (including Omega), and material-specific property relations.

In 1986, the Petroleum and Chemical Committee of MPC initiated a research program to evaluate different approaches to life assessment. Through extensive experimentation on various materials, including carbon steel and hard chromium-molybdenum steel, several important observations were made:

• Carbon steel exhibited minimal damage from creep strain, even under high stress levels and temperatures.

• The creep resistance of hard and brittle materials was significantly influenced by small amounts of strain, although visible creep cavities or cracks were not observed.

• Laboratory-damaged or ex-service materials showed negligible primary or secondary creep during subsequent testing.

• Strain rate consistently increased with strain during tests, and the rate of strain rate increase with stress was higher than predicted by Norton's law.

Based on their findings, the researchers concluded that strain rate, at the operating stress and temperature, can indicate material damage. They aimed to develop a model linking strain rate, strain, consumed life, and remaining life. Initially designed for thermally stabilized materials, the Omega Method's applicability extends to diverse situations. It incorporates Kachanov's equations for strain rate acceleration, prioritizing monotonically increasing strain rates. Emphasizing strain rate's significance, the method recommends referencing an ex-service database for ex-service materials.

In API 579, the MPC Project Omega program, which incorporates the Omega Method, offers a broader methodology for assessing remaining life compared to the Larson-Miller model. It considers strain-rate parameters, multi-axial damage parameters (including Omega), and material-specific property relations in the refining and petrochemical industry.

The MPC Project Omega program provides a comprehensive framework encompassing the Larson-Miller model for predicting remaining life in the creep regime.

The remaining life of a component, L, can be calculated using the following equations, where stress is in ksi (MPa), temperature is in degrees Fahrenheit (degrees Celsius), and the remaining life and time are in hours.

$$L = \frac{1}{\epsilon_{\text{dot}}\Omega_{m}}$$

where

$$\log_{10}(\dot\epsilon_{co}) = -\left[A_0 + \Delta^{sr}_{\Omega} + \frac{A_1 + A_2S_l + A_3S_l^2 + A_4S_l^3}{T_{\text{refa}} - T}\right]$$

$$\Omega_{m}=\Omega^{(\delta_{\omega +1}){n}}+\alpha{\omega}n_{BN}$$

$$\Omega_{n} = \max{(\Omega - n_{BN}, 3.0)}$$

$$\log_{10}(\Omega) = \left[(B_{0} + \Delta^{cd}{\Omega}) + \left(\frac{B_1 + B_2S_l + B_3S_l^2 + B_4S_l^3}{T{\text{refa}} - T}\right)\right]$$

$$\delta_{\Omega} = \Beta_{\Omega} \cdot \left(\frac{{\sigma_{1} + \sigma_{2} + \sigma_{3}}}{{\sigma_{e}}} - 1.0\right)$$

$$n_{BA} = -\frac{{(A_{2} + 2A_{3}S_{l} + 3A_{4}S_{l}^2)}}{{T_{\text{refa}} + T}}$$

where

$$T_{refa} = 460.0 for F^{o}$$
$$T_{refa} = 273.0 for  C^{o}$$
$$S_{l} = \log_{10}(\sigma_{e})$$

Von Mises yield criterion is specifically applicable to ductile materials

$\sigma_{e} = \frac{1}{\sqrt{2}} \cdot \sqrt{(\sigma_{1}-\sigma_{2})^2+(\sigma_{1}-\sigma_{3})^2+(\sigma_{2}-\sigma_{3})^2}$

Value obtained by MPC Omega project for the equation for different materials can be found in ASME API 579-1/ASME FFS-1-2021 Fitness-For-Service.

Here, Nomenclature

L = rupture life (hours)
$\dot{\varepsilon}_{co}$ = initial or reference creep strain rate at the start of the time period being evaluated based on stress state and temperature
$\Omega_{m}$ = Omega multiaxial damage parameter
$A_{0}$ to $A_{s}$ = cure-fit coefficients for the Yield strength data, the MPC Project Omega creep strain rate parameter, or the Larson Miller Parameter
$\Delta^{cd}_{\Omega}$ = adjustment factor for creep ductility in the Project Omega Model; a range of +0.3 for brittle behavior and -0.3 for ductile behavior can be used
$T_{refa}$ = reference temperature
$T$ = temperature
$S_{l}$ = stress parameter
$\alpha_{\Omega}$ = parameter based on the state-of-stress for MPC Project Omega Life Assessment Model = 3.0 - pressurized sphere or formed head.
$n_{BN}$ = Bailey Norton coefficient evaluated at the reference stress in the current load increment, used in the MPC Project Omega Life Assessment Method
$\Omega$ = Omega uniaxial damage parameter
$B_{0}$ to $B_{5}$ = curve-fit coefficients for the MPC project Omega parameter, as applicable
$\Beta_{\Omega}$ = Prager factor equal to 0.33, for MPC project Omega Life Assessment Model
$\sigma_{1}$to $\sigma_{3}$ = principal stress
$\sigma_{e}$ = effective stress

== Creep test program for MPC project Omega ==
$\Omega$ can be obtained by accelerated creep test in which strain is recirded, interpolating the data $(\ln, \varepsilon_{c})$

$$\ln(\dot{\varepsilon}) = \Omega \dot{\varepsilon}_c + \ln(\dot{\varepsilon}_0)$$

When adopting the Omega Method for a remaining life assessment, it is sufficient to estimate the creep strain rate at the service stress and temperature by conducting creep tests on the material that has been exposed to service conditions.

The creep test program followed the guidelines provided in technical literature and API 579-1 for the implementation of the Omega Method. The program consisted of the following steps:

- Conducted five longitudinal tests on specimens to determine the current strain rate at two different temperature values and stress levels close to those experienced in service.
- Chose test conditions based on the strain-gage capability to accurately measure small strain rate values.
- Performed two additional tests on transversal (circumferential) specimens to compare material behavior in different directions, minimizing the influence of welds on specimen behavior.
- Tested additional longitudinal specimens with a "reduced" gage length to investigate the influence of geometry on test results.
- Machined all specimens according to EN 10291 specifications for uniaxial creep testing in tension.
- Carried out tests under constant load with continuous monitoring of creep strains.
- Excluded the need for creep tests to define the "2" parameter based on the assumption of reliable data from previous experimental programs.
- Observed initial differences in strain rates between circumferential and longitudinal tests, but further tests confirmed minimal effect of specimen drawing direction and attributed any differences to specimen geometry.
- Demonstrated satisfactory agreement between all tests and the model proposed by the Omega approach, with good alignment to API 579-1 data.
- Determined the value of A(t) that provided the best fit for the experimental data using the API 579-1 curve.
- The consumed life fraction "f" was calculated using the Omega approach equations based on the average behavior of non-exposed material. The calculated value of "f" provides an estimate of how much of the material's life has been used

The consumed life fraction "f" can be calculated using the following equation:

$$f = 1 - \frac{{\dot{\varepsilon}_0}}{{\dot{\varepsilon}(t)}} = 1 - 10^{A_0(t) - A_0(t=0)}$$

Here, $\dot{\varepsilon}_0$ represents the initial strain rate, $\dot{\varepsilon}(t)$ represents the current strain rate, $A_0(t)$ represents the logarithm of the strain rate at time $t$, and $A_0(t=0)$ represents the logarithm of the initial strain rate.

Overall, the creep test program involved conducting tests on various specimens, comparing different directions, ensuring compliance with testing standards, and validating the results with the Omega Method model and API 579-1 data.

== Creep Life Assessment Using the Omega Method: A Case Study for creep strength enhanced ferritic (CSEF) steels ==
CSEF steels have complex microstructures, and conventional techniques struggle to accurately assess their creep life. The Omega method offers a systematic approach that combines hardness measurements with other techniques to overcome these challenges. The article highlights that the Omega method provides a systematic approach for creep life assessment by combining hardness measurements with other techniques such as the potential drop method and tertiary creep modeling. The potential drop method measures the electric potential drop ratio, which is correlated to the hardness drop. This correlation enables accurate creep life prediction using the hardness model. This integration of hardness measurements and the potential drop method enhances the accuracy of creep life assessments.

Compared to the Larson-Miller parameter commonly used for creep life assessment, the Omega method offers several advantages for assessing CSEF steels. The Omega method provides a more suitable and accurate approach by considering microstructural factors and utilizing hardness measurements, which are directly influenced by the material's degradation. This combination of microstructure and mechanical property assessment allows for a comprehensive evaluation of the creep life of CSEF steels, leading to more reliable predictions of the material's remaining useful life.

In comparison to the Larson-Miller parameter, which is commonly used for creep life assessment, the Omega method offers advantages in assessing CSEF steels. CSEF steels exhibit different degradation behavior compared to conventional steels, making it challenging to apply conventional techniques. The Omega method, with its focus on microstructural factors and hardness measurements, provides a more suitable approach for accurately assessing the creep life of CSEF steels.

== See also ==
- Creep (deformation)

== Sources ==
- Hertzberg, Richard W. Deformation and Fracture Mechanics of Engineering Materials, Fourth Edition. John Wiley and Sons, Inc., Hoboken, NJ: 1996.
- Larson, Frank R. and Miller, James: A Time-Temperature Relationship for Rupture and Creep Stresses. Trans. ASME, vol. 74, pp. 765−775.
- Fuchs, G. E. High Temperature Alloys, Kirk–Othmer Encyclopedia of Chemical Technology
- Smith & Hashemi, Foundations of Material Science and Engineering
- Dieter, G.E. Mechanical Metallurgy, Third Edition, McGraw-Hill Inc., 1986, p 461-465, ISBN 0-07-016893-8.
