= Voids in mineral aggregate =

Physical property of compacted asphalt

Voids in Mineral Aggregate (VMA) is the intergranular space occupied by asphalt and air in a compacted asphalt mixture. In a component diagram, it is the sum of the volume of air and the volume of effective asphalt. The volume of absorbed asphalt is not considered to be a part of VMA because it is part of the pore structure of the mineral aggregate.

VMA= V_{effective asphalt} + V_{air voids}
