= Nabarro–Herring creep =

Material deformation mechanism

In materials science, Nabarro–Herring creep is a mechanism of deformation of crystalline materials (and amorphous materials) that occurs at low stresses and held at elevated temperatures in fine-grained materials. In Nabarro–Herring creep, atoms diffuse through the crystals, and the rate of creep varies inversely with the square of the grain size so fine-grained materials creep faster than coarser-grained ones. NH creep is solely controlled by diffusional mass transport. This phenomenon is named after Frank Nabarro and Conyers Herring who discussed the phenomenon in 1950.

This type of creep results from the diffusion of vacancies from regions of high chemical potential at grain boundaries subjected to normal tensile stresses to regions of lower chemical potential where the average tensile stresses across the grain boundaries are zero. Self-diffusion within the grains of a polycrystalline solid can cause the solid to yield to an applied shear stress, the yielding being caused by a diffusional flow of matter within each crystal grain away from boundaries where there is a normal pressure and toward those where there is a normal tension. Atoms migrating in the opposite direction account for the creep strain (ε_{NH}). The creep strain rate is derived in the next section. NH creep is more important in ceramics than metals as dislocation motion is more difficult to effect in ceramics.

== Derivation of the creep rate ==
The Nabarro–Herring creep rate, $\dot\varepsilon_{\rm NH}$, can be derived by considering an individual rectangular grain (in a single or polycrystal). Two opposing sides have a compressive stress applied and the other two have a tensile stress applied. The atomic volume is decreased by compression and increased by tension. Under this change, the activation energy to form a vacancy is altered by $\pm \sigma\Omega$. The atomic volume is $\Omega$ and the stress is $\sigma$. The plus and minus indication is an increase or decrease in the activation energy due to the tensile and compressive stresses, respectively. The fraction of vacancy concentrations in the compressive ($N_{\nu}^C$) and tensile ($N_{\nu}^T$) regions are given as:

$$\begin{align}
N_{\nu}^C &\approx \exp \left(-\frac{Q_f}{kT} \right) \exp \left(-\frac{\sigma \Omega}{kT} \right) \\[4pt]
N_{\nu}^T &\approx \exp \left(-\frac{Q_f}{kT} \right) \exp \left(\frac{\sigma \Omega}{kT} \right)
\end{align}$$

In these equations $Q_f$ is the vacancy formation energy, $k$ is the Boltzmann constant, and $T$ is the absolute temperature. These vacancy concentrations are maintained at the lateral and horizontal surfaces in the grain. These net concentrations drive vacancies to the compressive regions from the tensile ones which causes grain elongation in one dimension and grain compression in the other. This is creep deformation caused by a flux of vacancy motion.

The vacancy flux, $J_{\nu}$, associated with this motion is given by:

$$J_{\nu} = -D_{\nu} \left(\frac{\delta N_{\nu}}{\delta x}\right)$$

where $D_{\nu}$ is the vacancy diffusivity. This is given as:

$$D_{\nu} = D_{0\nu} \exp \left(\frac{-Q_m}{kT} \right)$$

where $D_{0\nu}$ is the diffusivity when 0 vacancies are present and $Q_m$ is the vacancy motion energy. The term $\tfrac{\delta N_{\nu}}{\delta x}$ is the vacancy concentration gradient. The term $\delta x$ is proportional to the grain size $d$ and $\delta N_{\nu}= N_{\nu}^T - N_{\nu}^C$. If we multiply $J_{\nu}$ by $d^2$ we obtain:

$$\frac{\delta V}{\delta t} \approx D_{0\nu} d \exp \left(- \frac{Q_f+Q_m}{kT} \right) \left[\exp\left(\frac{\sigma \Omega}{kT} \right)-  \exp\left( -\frac{\sigma \Omega}{kT}\right) \right]$$

where $\tfrac{\delta V}{\delta t}$ is the volume changed per unit time during creep deformation. The change in volume can be related to the change in length along the tensile axis as $\delta V \approx d^2 \delta d$. Using the relationship between $\delta V$ and $\delta d$ the NH creep rate is given by:

$$\begin{align}
\dot\varepsilon_{\rm NH} &= \frac{1}{d}\frac{\delta d}{\delta t} \\[4pt]
\dot\varepsilon_{\rm NH} &= \frac{D_{0\nu}}{d^2} \exp \left(-\frac{Q_f+Q_m}{kT} \right) \left[\exp \left(\frac{\sigma \Omega}{kT}\right) -\exp\left(-\frac{\sigma \Omega}{kT} \right)\right]
\end{align}$$

This equation can be greatly simplified. The lattice self-diffusion coefficient is given by:

$$D_L = D_{0 \nu} \exp \left(-\frac{Q_f+Q_m}{kT} \right)$$

As previously stated, NH creep occurs at low stresses and high temperatures. In this range $\sigma \Omega << kT$. For small $x$, $\exp(\pm x) \approx 1 \pm x$. Thus we can re-write $\dot\varepsilon_{\rm NH}$ as:

$$\dot\varepsilon_{\rm NH}  = A_{\rm NH} \left(\frac{D_L}{d^2}\right)\left(\frac{\sigma \Omega}{kT} \right)$$

where $A_{\rm NH}$ is a constant that absorbs the approximations in the derivation.

Alternatively, this can be derived in a different method where the constant $A_n$ has different dimensions. In this case, the NH creep rate $\dot\varepsilon$ is given by:

$$\dot\varepsilon = {A_n} \frac{Db^3\sigma}{d^2kT}$$

== Comparison to Coble creep ==
Coble creep is closely related to Nabarro–Herring creep and is controlled by diffusion as well. Unlike Nabarro–Herring creep, mass transport occurs by diffusion along the surface of single crystals or the grain boundaries in a polycrystal. For a general expression of creep rate, the comparison between Nabarro–Herring and Coble creep can be presented as follows:

$$\dot\varepsilon = \frac{ADGb}{kT}{\left(\frac{\sigma}{G}\right)}^n{\left(\frac{b}{d}\right)}^p$$

Mechanism	favorable conditions	Description	A	n	p
Nabarro–Herring creep	High temperature, low stress and small grain size	Vacancy diffusion through the crystal lattice	10–15	1	2
Coble creep	Low stress, fine grain sizes and temperature less than those for which NH creep dominates	Vacancy diffusion along grain boundaries	30–50	1	3

G is the shear modulus. The diffusivity is obtained form the tracer diffusivity, $D^*$. The dimensionless constant $A_n$ depends intensively on the geometry of grains. The parameters $A$, $n$ and $p$ are dependent on creep mechanisms. Nabbaro–Herring creep does not involve the motion of dislocations. It predominates over high-temperature dislocation-dependent mechanisms only at low stresses, and then only for fine-grained materials. Nabarro–Herring creep is characterized by creep rates that increase linearly with the stress and inversely with the square of grain diameter.

In contrast, in Coble creep atoms diffuse along grain boundaries and the creep rate varies inversely with the cube of the grain size. Lower temperatures favor Coble creep and higher temperatures favor Nabbaro–Herring creep because the activation energy for vacancy diffusion within the lattice is typically larger than that along the grain boundaries, thus lattice diffusion slows down relative to grain boundary diffusion with decreasing temperature.

== Experimental and theoretical examples ==
- Creep in dense, polycrystalline magnesium oxide and iron-doped polycrystalline magnesia
- Compressive creep in polycrystalline beryllium oxide
- Creep in polycrystalline Al_{2}O_{3} that has been doped with Cr, Fe, or Ti
- Creep in dry synthetic dunite which results in trace melt and some grain growth
- Reproduced for nanopolycrystalline systems in Phase Field Crystal simulations (theory matched in terms of creep stress and grain size exponents)
