= Coble creep =

Mechanism of crystalline solid deformation

A diagram showing how atoms and vacancies move through a grain as the mechanism of Coble creep

In materials science, Coble creep, a form of diffusion creep, is a mechanism for deformation of crystalline solids. Contrasted with other diffusional creep mechanisms, Coble creep is similar to Nabarro–Herring creep in that it is dominant at lower stress levels and higher temperatures than creep mechanisms utilizing dislocation glide. Coble creep occurs through the diffusion of atoms in a material along grain boundaries. This mechanism is observed in polycrystals or along the surface in a single crystal, which produces a net flow of material and a sliding of the grain boundaries.

It was introduced by American materials scientist Robert L. Coble in 1962. Coble first reported his theory of how materials creep across grain boundaries and at high temperatures in alumina. Here he famously noticed a different creep mechanism that was more dependent on the size of the grain.

The strain rate in a material experiencing Coble creep is given by
$$\begin{align}
\frac{d\varepsilon_C}{dt} \equiv \dot{\varepsilon}_C
&= A_C \frac{\delta'}{d^3} \frac{\sigma\Omega}{k_{\rm B}T}D_0 \exp\left(-\frac{Q_f + Q_m}{k_{\rm B}T}\right) \\[4pt]
&= A_C \frac{\delta'}{d^3} \frac{\sigma\Omega}{k_{\rm B}T} D_{\rm GB}
\end{align}$$
where

$A_c$ is a geometric prefactor
$\sigma$ is the applied stress,
$d$ is the average grain diameter,
$\delta'$ is the grain boundary width,
$D_{\rm GB} = D_0 \exp\left(-\tfrac{Q_f\, +\, Q_m}{k_{\rm B}T}\right)$ is the diffusion coefficient in the grain boundary,

$Q_f$ is the vacancy formation energy,
$Q_m$ is the activation energy for diffusion along the grain boundary

$k_{\rm B}$ is the Boltzmann constant,
$T$ is the thermodynamic temperature (in kelvins)
$\Omega$ is the atomic volume for the material.

== Derivation ==
Coble creep, a diffusive mechanism, is driven by a vacancy (or mass) concentration gradient. The change in vacancy concentration $\Delta C$ from its equilibrium value $C_0$ is given by

$$\Delta C = C_0 \frac{\sigma\Omega}{kT}$$

This can be seen by noting that $\Delta C\propto C_0 e^{\sigma\Omega/kT} - C_0 e^{-\sigma\Omega/kT}$ and taking a high temperature expansion, where the first term on the right hand side is the vacancy concentration from tensile stress and the second term is the concentration due to compressive stress. This change in concentration occurs perpendicular to the applied stress axis, while parallel to the stress there is no change in vacancy concentration (due to the resolved stress and work being zero).

We continue by assuming a spherical grain, to be consistent with the derivation for Nabarro–Herring creep; however, we will absorb geometric constants into a proportionality constant $A$. If we consider the vacancy concentration across the grain under an applied tensile stress, then we note that there is a larger vacancy concentration at the equator (perpendicular to the applied stress) than at the poles (parallel to the applied stress). Therefore, a vacancy flux exists between the poles and equator of the grain. The vacancy flux is given by Fick's first law at the boundary: the diffusion coefficient $D_v$ times the gradient of vacancy concentration. For the gradient, we take the average value given by $\Delta C / (\pi R / 2)$ where we've divided the total concentration difference by the arclength between equator and pole then multiply by the boundary width $\delta'$ and length $2\pi R$.

$$J_v = A' D_v \frac{\Delta C}{\pi R/2}\delta' (2\pi R)$$

where $A'$ is a proportionality constant. From here, we note that the volume change $\pi R^2 dR/dt$ due to a flux of vacancies diffusing from a source of area $\pi R^2$ is the vacancy flux $J_v$ times atomic volume $\Omega$:

$$J_v\Omega = \pi R^2 dR/dt = \pi R^3 \dot{\epsilon}$$

where the second equality follows from the definition of strain rate: $\dot{\epsilon} = (1/R)(dR/dt)$. From here we can read off the strain rate:

$$\dot{\epsilon}_C = \frac{J_v\Omega}{\pi R^3} = A D_v\Delta C\Omega\frac{\delta'}{R^3} = A D_{GB}\frac{\sigma\Omega}{kT}\frac{\delta'}{R^3}$$

where $A' \rightarrow A$ has absorbed constants and the vacancy diffusivity through the grain boundary $D_{GB}=D_v C_0\Omega$.

== Comparison to other creep mechanisms ==
=== Nabarro–Herring ===
Coble creep and Nabarro–Herring creep are closely related mechanisms. They are both diffusion processes, driven by the same concentration gradient of vacancies, occur in high temperature, low stress environments and their derivations are similar. For both mechanisms, the strain rate $\dot{\epsilon}$ is linearly proportional to the applied stress $\sigma$ and there is an exponential temperature dependence. The difference is that for Coble creep, mass transport occurs along grain boundaries, whereas for Nabarro–Herring the diffusion occurs through the crystal. Because of this, Nabarro–Herring creep does not have a dependence on grain boundary thickness, and has a weaker dependence on grain size $d$. In Nabarro–Herring creep, the strain rate is proportional to $d^{-2}$ as opposed to the $d^{-3}$ dependence for Coble creep. When considering the net diffusional creep rate, the sum of both diffusional rates is vital as they work in a parallel processes.

The activation energy for Nabarro–Herring creep is, in general, different than that of Coble creep. This can be used to identify which mechanism is dominant. For example, the activation energy for dislocation climb is the same as for Nabarro–Herring, so by comparing the temperature dependence of low and high stress regimes, one can determine whether Coble creep or Nabarro–Herring creep is dominant.

Researchers commonly use these relationships to determine which mechanism is dominant in a material; by varying the grain size and measuring how the strain rate is affected, they can determine the value of $n$ in $\dot{\epsilon}~\alpha ~d^n$ and conclude whether Coble or Nabarro–Herring creep is dominant.

=== Dislocation creep ===
Under moderate to high stress, the dominant creep mechanism is no longer linear in the applied stress $\sigma$. Dislocation creep, sometimes called power law creep (PLC), has a power law dependence on the applied stress ranging from 3 to 8. Dislocation movement is related to the atomic and lattice structure of the crystal, so different materials respond differently to stress, as opposed to Coble creep which is always linear. This makes the two mechanisms easily identifiable by finding the slope of $\log{\dot{\epsilon}}$ vs $\log{\sigma}$.

Dislocation climb-glide and Coble creep both induce grain boundary sliding.

=== Deformation mechanism maps ===
To understand the temperature and stress regimes in which Coble creep is dominant for a material, it is helpful to look at deformation mechanism maps. These maps plot a normalized stress versus a normalized temperature and demarcate where specific creep mechanisms are dominant for a given material and grain size (some maps imitate a 3rd axis to show grain size). These maps should only be used as a guide, as they are based on heuristic equations. These maps are helpful to determine the creep mechanism when the working stresses and temperature are known for an application to guide the design of the material.

== Grain boundary sliding ==
Since Coble creep involves mass transport along grain boundaries, cracks or voids would form within the material without proper accommodation. Grain boundary sliding is the process by which grains move to prevent separation at grain boundaries. This process typically occurs on timescales significantly faster than that of mass diffusion (an order of magnitude quicker). Because of this, the rate of grain boundary sliding is typically irrelevant to determining material processes. However, certain grain boundaries, such as coherent boundaries or where structural features inhibit grain boundary movement, can slow down the rate of grain boundary sliding to the point where it needs to be taken into consideration. The processes underlying grain boundary sliding are the same as those causing diffusional creep

This mechanism is originally proposed by Ashby and Verrall in 1973 as a grain switching creep. This is competitive with Coble creep; however, grain switching will dominate at large stresses while Coble creep dominates at low stresses.

This model predicts a strain rate with the threshold strain for grain switching $0.72\gamma/d$.

$$\dot{\epsilon}_{GS} \propto \frac{\Omega}{kT}\frac{\delta'D_{GB}}{d^3}(\sigma-\frac{0.72\gamma}{d})$$

The relation to Coble creep is clear by looking at the first term which is dependent on grain boundary thickness $\delta'$ and inverse grain size cubed $d^{-3}$.
