= Inconel =

Austenitic nickel-chromium superalloys

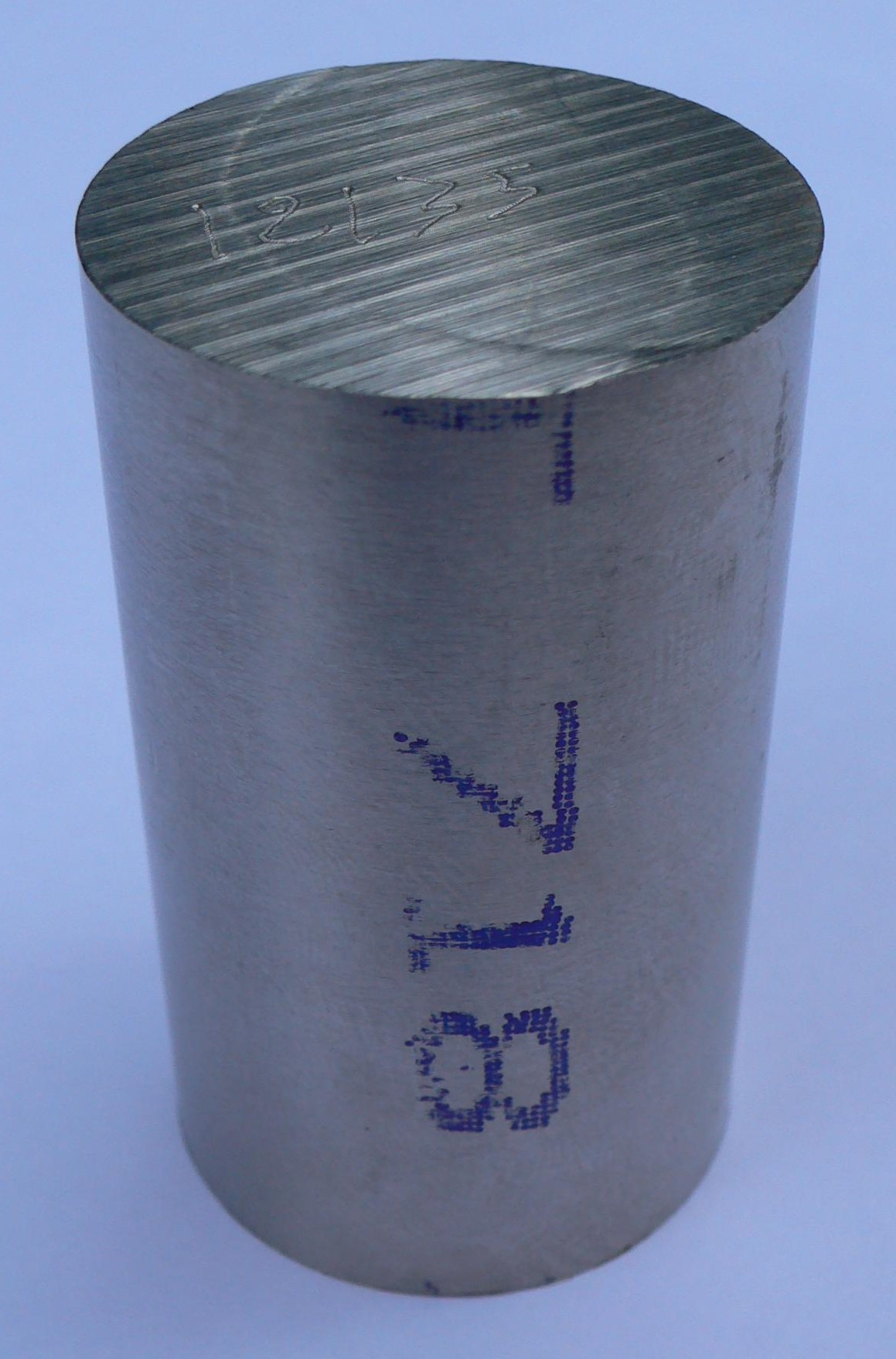
Inconel 718 round bar

Inconel (/ˈɪnkənəl/ IN-co-nel) is a superalloy composed mainly of nickel, chromium, and iron that is often used in extreme environments where components are subjected to high temperature, pressure, or mechanical loads. Inconel alloys are oxidation- and corrosion-resistant. When heated, Inconel forms a thick, stable passivating oxide layer protecting the surface from further attack. Inconel retains strength over a wide temperature range, making it attractive for high-temperature applications in which aluminum and steel would succumb to creep as a result of thermally-induced crystal vacancies. Inconel's high-temperature strength is developed by solid solution strengthening or precipitation hardening, depending on the alloy.

Inconel was discovered in the early 1930s by scientists at the International Nickel Company (later Inco Limited). Common trade names for various Inconel alloys include:

- Alloy 625: Inconel 625, Chronin 625, Altemp 625, Sanicro 625, Haynes 625, Nickelvac 625 Nicrofer 6020 and UNS designation N06625.
- Alloy 600: NA14, BS3076, 2.4816, NiCr15Fe (FR), NiCr15Fe (EU), NiCr15Fe8 (DE) and UNS designation N06600.
- Alloy 718: Nicrofer 5219, Superimphy 718, Haynes 718, Pyromet 718, Supermet 718, Udimet 718 and UNS designation N07718.

== History ==
The Inconel family of alloys was first developed before December 1932, when its trademark was registered by the International Nickel Company of Delaware and New York. A significant early use was found in support of the development of the Whittle jet engine, during the 1940s by research teams at Henry Wiggin & Co of Hereford, England a subsidiary of the Mond Nickel Company, which merged with Inco in 1928. The Hereford Works and its properties including the Inconel trademark were acquired in 1998 by Special Metals Corporation.

== Specific data ==
Alloy	Solidus °C (°F)	Liquidus °C (°F)
Inconel 600	1354 (2,469)	1413 (2,575)
Inconel 617	1332 (2,430)	1377 (2,511)
Inconel 625	1290 (2,350)	1350 (2,460)
Inconel 690	1343 (2,449)	1377 (2,511)
Inconel 718	1260 (2,300)	1336 (2,437)
Inconel 738CL	1269 (2,316)	1336 (2,437)
Inconel X-750	1390 (2,530)	1430 (2,610)

== Composition ==
Inconel alloys vary widely in their compositions, but all are predominantly nickel, with chromium as the second element.

Inconel	Element, proportion by mass (%)														
Inconel	Ni	Cr	Fe	Mo	Nb & Ta	Co	Mn	Cu	Al	Ti	Si	C	S	P	B
600	≥72.0 (Note: Includes cobalt)	14.0–17.0	6.0–10.0			—N/a	≤1.0	≤0.5			≤0.5	≤0.15	≤0.015		
617	44.2–61.0	20.0–24.0	≤3.0	8.0–10.0		10.0–15.0	≤0.5	≤0.5	0.8–1.5	≤0.6	≤0.5	0.05–0.15	≤0.015	≤0.015	≤0.006
625	≥58.0	20.0–23.0	≤5.0	8.0–10.0	3.15–4.15	≤1.0	≤0.5		≤0.4	≤0.4	≤0.5	≤0.1	≤0.015	≤0.015	
690	≥58	27–31	7–11				≤0.50	≤0.50			≤0.50	≤0.05	≤0.015		
Nuclear grade 690	≥58	28–31	7–11			≤0.10	≤0.50	≤0.50			≤0.50	≤0.04	≤0.015		
718	50.0–55.0	17.0–21.0	Balance	2.8–3.3	4.75–5.5	≤1.0	≤0.35	≤0.3	0.2–0.8	0.65–1.15	≤0.35	≤0.08	≤0.015	≤0.015	≤0.006
X-750	≥70.0	14.0–17.0	5.0–9.0		0.7–1.2	≤1.0	≤1.0	≤0.5	0.4–1.0	2.25–2.75	≤0.5	≤0.08	≤0.01		

== Properties ==
When heated, Inconel forms a thick and stable passivating oxide layer protecting the surface from further attack. Inconel retains strength over a wide temperature range, attractive for high-temperature applications where aluminium and steel would succumb to creep as a result of thermally induced crystal vacancies (see Arrhenius equation). Inconel's high temperature strength is developed by solid solution strengthening or precipitation strengthening, depending on the alloy. In age-hardening or precipitation-strengthening varieties, small amounts of niobium combine with nickel to form the intermetallic compound Ni_{3}Nb or gamma double prime (γ″). Gamma prime forms small cubic crystals that inhibit slip and creep effectively at elevated temperatures. The formation of gamma-prime crystals increases over time, especially after three hours of a heat exposure of 850 °C (1,560 °F), and continues to grow after 72 hours of exposure.

== Strengthening mechanisms ==
The most prevalent hardening mechanisms for Inconel alloys are precipitate strengthening and solid solution strengthening. In Inconel alloys, one of the two often dominates. For alloys like Inconel 718, precipitate strengthening is the main strengthening mechanism. The majority of strengthening comes from the presence of gamma double prime (γ″) precipitates. Inconel alloys have a γ matrix phase with a face-centered cubic (fcc) structure. γ″ precipitates are made of Ni and Nb, specifically with a Ni_{3}Nb composition. These precipitates are fine, coherent, disk-shaped, intermetallic particles with a tetragonal structure. This is phase will be the most important to stabilize, so Inconel alloys are strengthened by limiting coarsening of γ″ precipitates and limiting the γ″ to delta (δ) phase transition.

Secondary precipitate strengthening comes from gamma prime (γ′) precipitates. The γ′ phase can appear in multiple compositions such as Ni_{3}(Al, Ti). The precipitate phase is coherent and has an fcc structure, like the γ matrix; The γ′ phase is much less prevalent than γ″. The volume fraction of the γ″ and γ′ phases are approximately 15% and 4% after precipitation, respectively. Because of the coherency between the γ matrix and the γ′ and γ″ precipitates, strain fields exist that obstruct the motion of dislocations. The prevalence of carbides with MX(Nb, Ti)(C, N) compositions also helps to strengthen the material. For precipitate strengthening, elements like niobium, titanium, and tantalum play a crucial role.

Because the γ″ phase is metastable, over-aging can result in the transformation of γ″ phase precipitates to δ phase precipitates, their stable counterparts. The δ phase has an orthorhombic structure, a Ni_{3}(Nb, Mo, Ti) composition, and is incoherent. As a result, the transformation of γ″ to δ in Inconel alloys leads to the loss of coherency strengthening, making for a weaker material. That being said, in appropriate quantities, the δ phase is responsible for grain boundary pinning and strengthening. Composition of Inconel alloys are tuned to maximize the stability of this metastable γ″ phase and to slow this transition. This results in a narrow range of Nb, Al, Ti, in Inconel alloys. These elements are also prone to forming other undesirable phases which segregate at grain boundaries and deplete the matrix of important elements.

Another common phase in Inconel alloys is the Laves intermetallic phase. Its compositions are (Ni, Cr, Fe)_{x}(Nb, Mo, Ti)_{y} and Ni_{y}Nb, it is brittle, and its presence can be detrimental to the mechanical behavior of Inconel alloys. Sites with large amounts of Laves phase are prone to crack propagation because of their higher potential for stress concentration. Additionally, due to its high Nb, Mo, and Ti content, the Laves phase can exhaust the matrix of these elements, ultimately limiting the γ″ phase formation and resulting in decreased precipitate and solid-solution strengthening more difficult.

During ageing, Niobium Carbide precipitation in Alloy 718 occurs predominantly at grain boundaries and proceeds from isolated precipitates to film-like boundary layers along the grain boundaries as temperature and hold time increase. The principal grain-boundary carbide is a niobium-rich MC type. Boundaries containing MC carbides are often bordered by distinct regions lacking γ″ and, to a lesser extent, γ′ precipitates. These precipitate-free zones arise from local depletion of solute elements and vacancies near the grain boundary. At around 700–750 °C (1,292–1,382 °F), the fraction of carbide-covered boundaries grows with time; at higher temperatures, co-precipitation with the δ phase is frequently observed. Progressive boundary coverage by carbides correlates with a shift in fracture mode from transgranular to intergranular, with microcracks often initiating at matrix–carbide interfaces where deformation bands impinge on the boundary.

The precipitation behavior of Inconel 718 is governed by its time–temperature–transformation characteristics, which describe how the microstructure evolves under different heat-treatment conditions. After solution annealing near 1,165 °C (2,129 °F), most phases such as γ′, γ″, δ, and Laves are dissolved back into the face-centered-cubic γ matrix. Controlled aging treatments are then used to selectively precipitate strengthening or stabilizing phases. Short aging at approximately 960 °C (1,760 °F) encourages the formation of the delta phase along grain boundaries, which refines the grain structure but can reduce the niobium available for γ″ precipitation. This is not favorable as γ″ is the primary precipitate responsible for strengthening. Subsequent aging at about 760 °C (1,400 °F) followed by a lower-temperature stage near 680 °C (1,256 °F) precipitates a fine dispersion of coherent gamma prime and γ″ particles throughout the matrix.

At longer times or higher temperatures, the metastable γ″ phase gradually transforms into δ, and coarse niobium-rich Laves or niobium carbide particles can form at grain boundaries. Such transformations consume matrix niobium and lead to over-aging, which decreases strength. Precise control of temperature and hold time during multi-step aging determines the balance between strengthening and microstructural stability in Inconel 718.

For alloys like Inconel 625, solid solution hardening is the main strengthening mechanism. In Inconel 625, the elevated Mo (~9 wt%) and Cr (~22 wt%) levels serve as strong solid‐solution matrix stiffeners that enhance creep resistance and high‐temperature strength without relying on the conventional superalloy age-hardening precipitates. Nb and Ta can also contribute to solid solution strengthening to a lesser extent. In solid solution strengthening, Mo atoms are substituted into the γ matrix of Inconel alloys. Because Mo atoms have a significantly larger radius than those of Ni (209 pm and 163 pm, respectively), the substitution creates strain fields in the lattice, which hinder the motion of dislocations, ultimately strengthening the material.

The combination of elemental composition and strengthening mechanisms is why Inconel alloys can maintain their favorable mechanical and physical properties, such as high strength and fatigue resistance, at elevated temperatures, specifically those up to 650 °C (1,202 °F).

== Machining ==
Inconel is a difficult metal to shape and to machine using traditional cold forming techniques due to rapid work hardening. After the first machining pass, work hardening tends to plastically deform either the workpiece or the tool on subsequent passes. For this reason, age-hardened Inconels such as 718 are typically machined using an aggressive but slow cut with a hard tool, minimizing the number of passes required. Alternatively, the majority of the machining can be performed with the workpiece in a "solutionized" form, with only the final steps being performed after age hardening. However some claim that Inconel can be machined extremely quickly with very fast spindle speeds using a multifluted ceramic tool with small width of cut at high feed rates as this causes localized heating and softening in front of the flute.

External threads are machined using a lathe to "single-point" the threads or by rolling the threads in the solution treated condition (for hardenable alloys) using a screw machine. Inconel 718 can also be roll-threaded after full aging by using induction heat to 700 °C (1,290 °F) without increasing the grain size. Holes with internal threads are made by threadmilling. Internal threads can also be formed using a sinker electrical discharge machining (EDM).

== Joining ==
Welding of some Inconel alloys (especially the gamma prime precipitation hardened family; e.g., Waspaloy and X-750) can be difficult due to cracking and microstructural segregation of alloying elements in the heat-affected zone. However, several alloys such as 625 and 718 have been designed to overcome these problems. The most common welding methods are gas tungsten arc welding and electron-beam welding.

== Uses ==
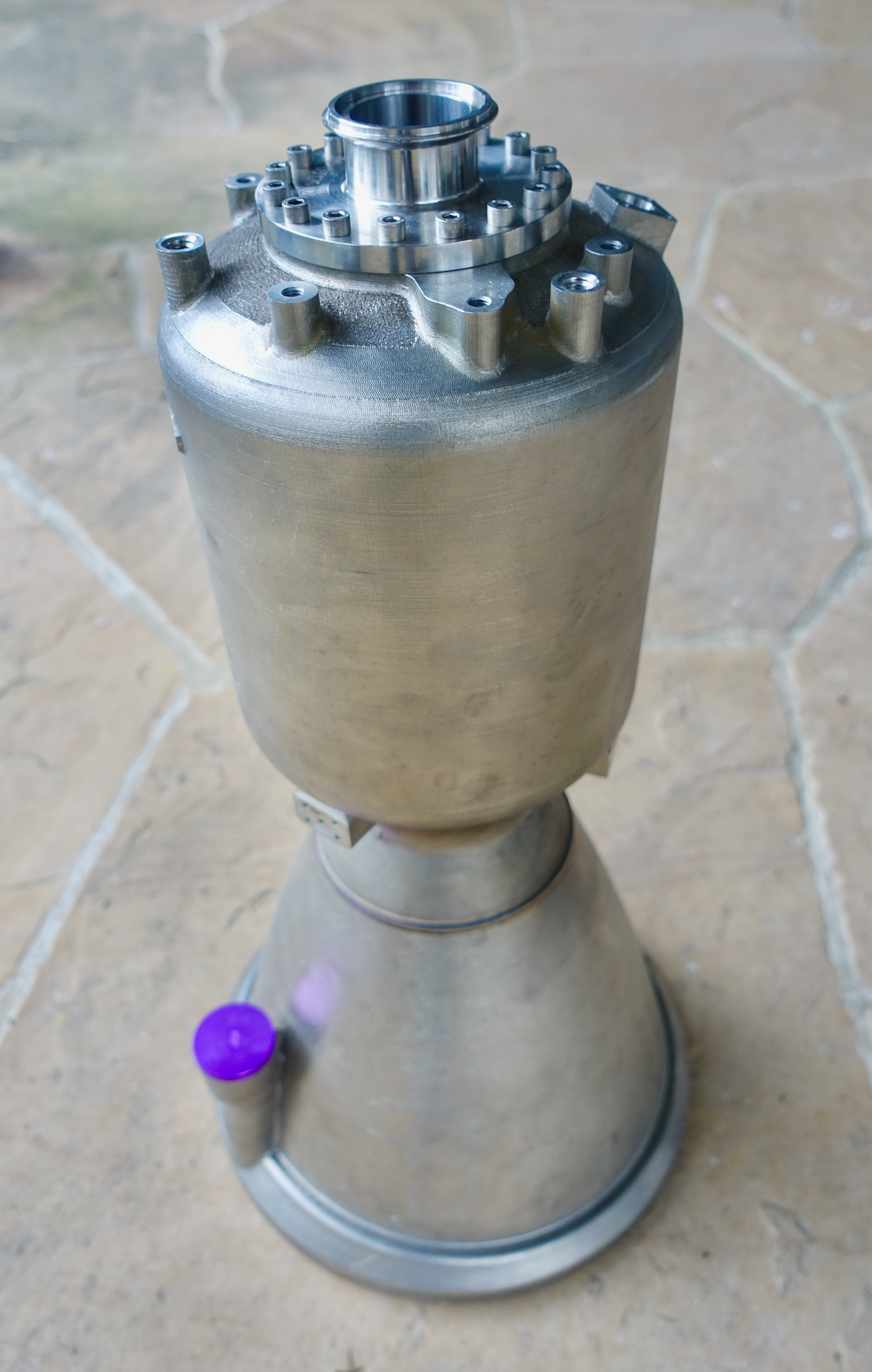
Delphin 3.0 rocket engine, used on Astra Rocket. 3D-printed in Inconel

Inconel is often used in extreme environments. It is common in gas turbine blades, seals, and combustors, as well as turbocharger rotors and seals, electric submersible well pump motor shafts, high temperature fasteners, chemical processing and pressure vessels, heat exchanger tubing, steam generators and core components in nuclear pressurized water reactors, natural gas processing with contaminants such as H_{2}S and CO_{2}, firearm sound suppressor blast baffles, and Formula One, NASCAR, NHRA, and APR, LLC exhaust systems. It is also used in the turbo system of the third generation Mazda RX-7, and the exhaust systems of high powered Wankel engine and Norton motorcycles where exhaust temperatures reach more than 1,000 °C (1,830 °F). Inconel is increasingly used in the boilers of waste incinerators. The Joint European Torus and DIII-D tokamaks' vacuum vessels are made of Inconel. Inconel 718 is commonly used for cryogenic storage tanks, downhole shafts, wellhead parts, and in the aerospace industry—where it has become a prime candidate material for constructing heat resistant turbines.

=== Aerospace ===
- The Space Shuttle used four Inconel studs to secure the solid rocket boosters to the launch platform, eight total studs supported the entire weight of the ready to fly Shuttle system. Eight frangible nuts are encased on the outside of the solid rocket boosters, at launch explosives separated the nuts releasing the Shuttle from its launch platform.
- North American Aviation constructed the skin of the North American X-15 rocket-powered aircraft out of Inconel X/750 alloy.
- Rocketdyne used Inconel X-750 for the thrust chamber of the F-1 rocket engine used in the first stage of the Saturn V booster.
- SpaceX uses Inconel (Inconel 718) in the engine manifold of their Merlin engine which powers the Falcon 9 launch vehicle.
- In a first for 3D printing, the SpaceX SuperDraco rocket engine that provides launch escape system for the Dragon V2 crew-carrying space capsule is fully printed. In particular, the engine combustion chamber is printed of Inconel using a process of direct metal laser sintering, and operates at very high temperature and a chamber pressure of 6.9 megapascals (1,000 psi).

=== Automotive ===
- Tesla claims to use Inconel in place of steel in the main battery pack contactor of its Model S so that it remains springy under the heat of heavy current. Tesla claims that this allows these upgraded vehicles to safely increase the maximum pack output from 1300 to 1500 amperes, allowing for an increase in power output (acceleration) Tesla refers to as "Ludicrous Mode".
- Ford Motor Company is using Inconel to make the turbine wheel in the turbocharger of its EcoBlue diesel engines introduced in 2016.
- The exhaust valves on NHRA Top Fuel and Funny Car drag racing engines are often made of Inconel.
- Ford Australia used Inconel valves in their turbocharged Barra engines. These valves have been proven very reliable, holding in excess of 1900 horsepower.
- BMW has since used Inconel in the exhaust manifold of its high performance luxury car, the BMW M5 E34 with the S38 engine, withstanding higher temperatures and reducing backpressure.
- Jaguar Cars has fit, in their Jaguar F-Type SVR high performance sports car, a new lightweight Inconel titanium exhaust system as standard which withstands higher peak temperatures, reduces backpressure and eliminates 16 kg (35 lb) of mass from the vehicle.
- DeLorean Motor Company offers Inconel replacements for failure prone OE trailing arm bolts on the DMC-12. Failure of these bolts can result in loss of the vehicle.
- Honda used Inconel 751 on the exhaust valves of the motorcycle CBR250RR (1990 - 2000) that enabled a 19,000 rpm redline.

Rolled Inconel was frequently used as the recording medium by engraving in black box recorders on aircraft.

Alternatives to the use of Inconel in chemical applications such as scrubbers, columns, reactors, and pipes are Hastelloy, perfluoroalkoxy (PFA) lined carbon steel or fiber reinforced plastic.

== Inconel alloys ==
Alloys of Inconel include:

- Inconel 188: Readily fabricated for commercial gas turbine and aerospace applications.
- Inconel 230: Alloy 230 Plate & Sheet mainly used by the power, aerospace, chemical processing and industrial heating industries.
- Inconel 600: In terms of high-temperature and corrosion resistance, Inconel 600 excels.
- Inconel 601
- Inconel 617: Solid solution strengthened (nickel-chromium-cobalt-molybdenum), high-temperature strength, corrosion and oxidation resistant, high workability and weldability. Incorporated in ASME Boiler and Pressure Vessel Code for high temperature nuclear applications such as molten salt reactors c. April, 2020.
- Inconel 625: Acid resistant, good weldability. The LCF version is typically used in bellows. It is commonly used for applications in aeronautic, aerospace, marine, chemical and petrochemical industries. It is also used for reactor-core and control-rod components in pressurized water reactors and as heat exchanger tubes in ammonia cracker plants for heavy water production.
- Inconel 690: Low cobalt content for nuclear applications, and low resistivity
- Inconel 706
- Inconel 713C: Precipitation hardenable nickel-chromium base cast alloy
- Inconel 718: Gamma double prime strengthened with good weldability
- Inconel 738
- Inconel X-750: Commonly used for gas turbine components, including blades, seals and rotors.
- Inconel 751: Increased aluminum content for improved rupture strength in the 1600 °F range
- Inconel 792: Increased aluminum content for improved high temperature corrosion resistant properties, used especially in gas turbines
- Inconel 907
- Inconel 909
- Inconel 925: Inconel 925 is a nonstabilized austenitic stainless steel with low carbon content.
- Inconel 939: Gamma prime strengthened to increase weldability

In age hardening or precipitation strengthening varieties, alloying additions of aluminum and titanium combine with nickel to form the intermetallic compound Ni_{3}(Ti,Al) or gamma prime (γ′). Gamma prime forms small cubic crystals that inhibit slip and creep effectively at elevated temperatures.

== Creep ==
Creep (deformation), the time-dependent plastic deformation of a material under a constant mechanical load at high temperature, is a critical design consideration for Inconel 718 components such as gas turbine disks and rocket engine parts.

- Creep mechanism: In the operational temperature range of 650*C to 700*C, the dominant creep mechanism is identified as dislocation climb. This process involves the movement of dislocation(s) using the diffusion of vacancies to bypass hardening precipitates, resulting in continuous and slow deformation.
- Stress dependence: The creep rate in Inconel 718 exhibits a highly non-linear relationship with applied stress, typically displaying a high stress exponent value of around n=36. This high exponent indicates that the creep performance is extremely sensitive to even small increases in operating stress.
- Fracture mode: Failure during creep loading is highly dependent on temperature and time. While the fracture may be ductile at lower high temperatures, at approximately 675*C, the failure mode tends to shift toward intergranular fracture.

== Thermomechanical fatigue ==
Components in gas turbines, such as blades and discs, experience simultaneous cycling of both mechanical stress and temperature, a phenomenon known as thermomechanical fatigue (TMF). TMF is often more damaging than simple isothermal fatigue because it incorporates both creep and environmental effects like oxidation damage.

- TMF loading: TMF tests simulate real-world conditions by cycling temperature and mechanical strain in two limiting modes. Fatigue crack are initiated from the surface regardless of the TMF conditions.
  1. In-Phase (IP) TMF: The maximum mechanical tensional stress occurs at the same time as the maximum temperature, while maximum compressive stress occurs at minimal temperature.
  2. Out-of-Phase (OOP) TMF: The maximum tensional stress occurs at the minimum temperature, and the maximum compressive stress occurs at the maximum temperature.
- Damage mechanism for Inconel 718
  1. Inconel 718 exhibits distinct TMF behavior for IP and OOP conditions. Under IP TMF, crack initiation and propagation occur mainly along grain boundaries due to the δ phase and increased effects of creep and oxidation, resulting in shorter fatigue life. In OOP TMF, cracks primarily grow trans-granularly, driven by oxidation, generally leading to longer fatigue life as compared to IP conditions. The difference in life between IP and OP modes becomes less pronounced at lower strain amplitudes, but distinct damage mechanisms remain evident.
- Additive manufacturing impact: Recent research on Inconel 718 produced by additive manufacturing (such as selective laser melting, SLM) indicates that the resulting fine-grained microstructures can offer an improved trade-off between creep and fatigue performance, often by balancing grain size control.

== See also ==
- Hastelloy
- Incoloy
- Monel
- Nichrome
- Nimonic
- Stellite
