= Inconel 625 =

Nickel-based superalloy

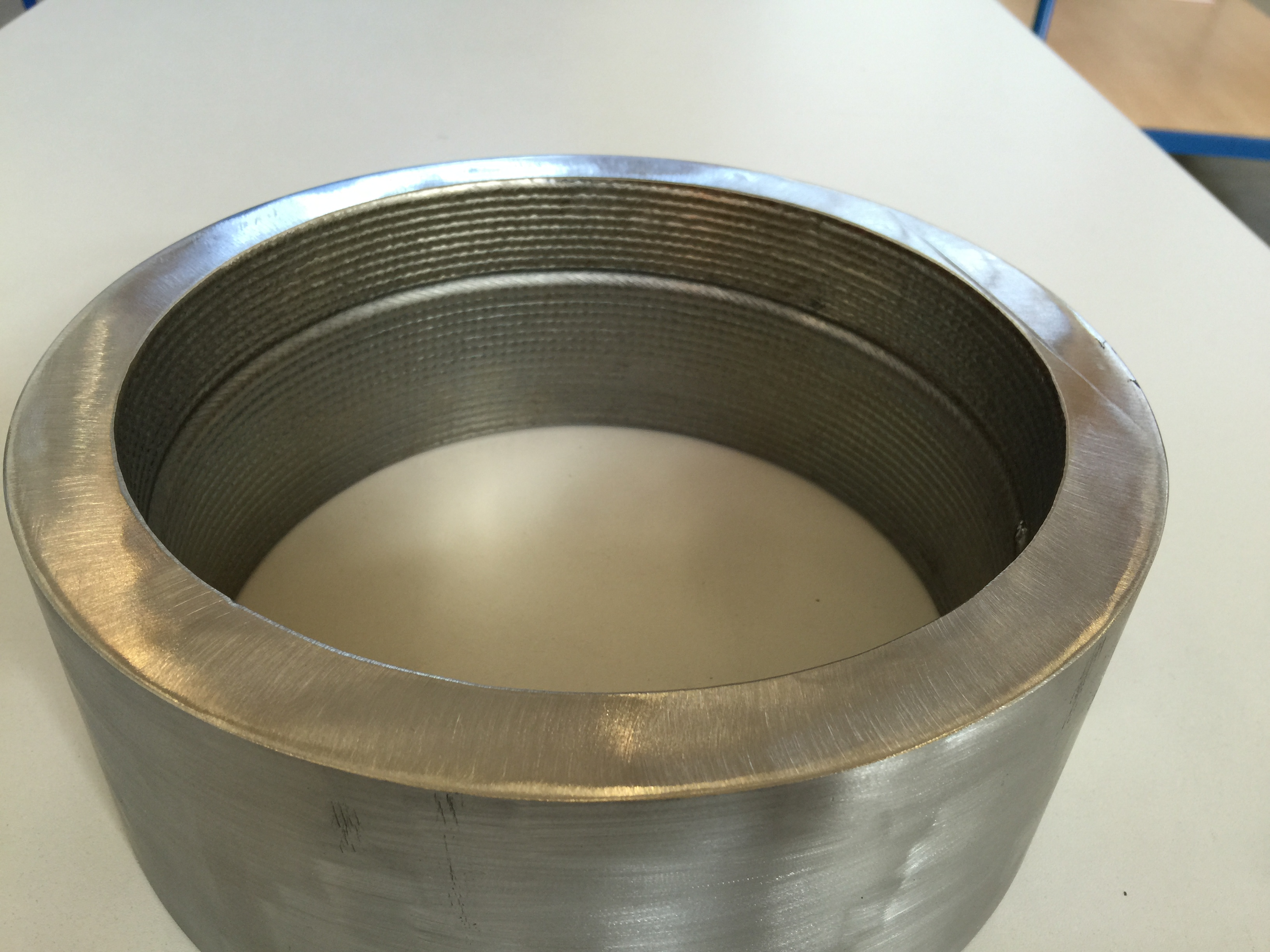
- Cladding overlay in a tube with Inconel 625
- Synonym: Werkstoff 2.4856
- Material type: Alloy

Alloy properties
- UNS identifier: N06625
- Alloy type: Nickel-based superalloy
- Composition: Ni 58%; Cr 20-23%; Mo 8-10%; Fe 5%; Nb + Ta 3.15-4.15%; Co 1%; Mn 0.5%; Si 0.5%; Al 0.4%; Ti 0.4%; C 0.1%; P 0.015%; S 0.015%

Physical properties
- Density (ρ): 8.4 g/cm^{3}

Mechanical properties
- Young's modulus (E): 207.5-147.5 @ 70–1,600 °F (21–871 °C) (annealed); 204.8-148.2 @ 70–1,600 °F (21–871 °C) (solution treated)
- Tensile strength (σ_{t}): Rod, bar, plate: 120–160 ksi (827–1,103 MPa) (as rolled), 120–150 ksi (827–1,034 MPa) (annealed)
- Elongation (ε) at break: Rod, bar, plate: 60-30% (as rolled and annealed)
- Poisson's ratio (ν): 0.278-0.336 @ 70–1,600 °F (21–871 °C) (annealed); 0.312-0.289 @ 70–1,600 °F (21–871 °C) (solution treated)
- Hardness—Brinell: Rod, bar, plate: 175-240 (as rolled)

Thermal properties
- Melting temperature (T_{m}): 2,350–2,460 °F (1,288–1,349 °C)
- Thermal conductivity (k): 50 BTU/(hr·ft⋅°F) @ −250 °F (−157 °C) – 175 BTU/(hr·ft⋅°F) @ 1,800 °F (982 °C)
- Specific heat capacity (c): 0.096-0.160 BTU/(lb⋅°F) (0.402-0.669 J/g⋅°C) @ 0–2,000 °F (−18–1,093 °C)

Electrical properties
- Permeability (μ): 1.006 @ 200 Oe (15.92 kA/m)
- Values displayed for tensile strength, elongation, and hardness are shown for various products under 4 in (10.2 cm) in size, and are measured at room temperature.

Inconel Alloy 625 (UNS designation N06625) is a nickel-based superalloy that possesses high strength properties and resistance to elevated temperatures. It also demonstrates remarkable protection against corrosion and oxidation. Its ability to withstand high stress and a wide range of temperatures, both in and out of water, as well as being able to resist corrosion while being exposed to highly acidic environments makes it a fitting choice for nuclear and marine applications.

Inconel 625 was developed in the 1960s with the purpose of creating a material that could be used for steam-line piping. Some modifications were made to its original composition that have enabled it to be even more creep-resistant and weldable. Because of this, the uses of Inconel 625 have expanded into a wide range of industries such as the chemical processing industry, and for marine and nuclear applications to make pumps and valves and other high pressure equipment.

Because of the metal's high Niobium (Nb) levels as well as its exposure to harsh environments and high temperatures, there was concern about the weldability of Inconel 625. Studies were therefore conducted to test the metal's weldability, tensile strength and creep resistance, and Inconel 625 was found to be an ideal choice for welding. Other well known names for Inconel 625 are Haynes 625, Nickelvac 625, Nicrofer 6020, Altemp 625 and Chronin 625.

== Chemistry ==
Inconel 625 was designed as a solid solution strengthened material with no significant microstructure. This holds true at low and high temperatures, but there is a region (923 to 1148 K) where precipitates form that are detrimental to the creep properties, and thus the strength, of the alloy. Under any creep conditions (high temperature with an applied stress), M_{23}C_{6}-type carbides form at the grain boundaries. When tested at 973 K, γ″ precipitates begin forming. These γ″ phase precipitates are ordered A_{3} B type with a composition of Ni_{3}(Nb, Al, Ti) and a tetragonal crystal structure. They form a disk-shaped morphology and are coherent with respect to the matrix. When tested at 998 K, a δ-phase precipitate begins forming which consist of Ni_{3}(Nb, Mo) in an orthorhombic crystal structure. They form in a needle-like morphology and are incoherent with the matrix. Both of these precipitates can be completely dissolved back into the matrix when the sample is heated to 1148 K for 5 hours. This leads to the ability to recover creep properties of the alloy to prolong the materials lifetime.

== Deformation Mechanism Map ==
Inconel 625's performance at different temperatures is extremely important to its use in all applications, since it is primarily a high temperature material. Clearly defining the service temperatures and stresses for Inconel 625 is critical for engineers to select when it is appropriate to use. To this end, a deformation mechanism map can be created, dictating the strain rate of the material at different homologous stresses and temperatures. To this end, Malmelöv et al. created a model for a mechanism based flow stress model, considering grain boundary strengthening, short range order strengthening, solid solution strengthening, long-range interactions from immobile dislocations, and power-law breakdown. Short range order strengthening occurs as dislocations encounter local obstacles. Higher obstacles leads to lower obstacle spacing, and a higher contribution to yield strength due to short range ordering. The long-range interactions arise from the pile-up of immobile dislocations, with a higher density of dislocations leading to higher strength. Recovery in the material results in a decrease in these dislocations, whereas hardening results in an increase. Power-law breakdown is the transition between climb- and glide-controlled deformation in the material, and has an associated equation. At any point, the mechanism that results in the lowest yield stress will dominate, dictating the yield stress of the material.

== Microstructural Evolution during Creep ==
Inconel 625 can undergo a number of microstructural changes during compressive creep, including recrystallization, precipitation of γ″, and precipitation of δ. It is commonly known that nickel-based alloys can have annealing twins due to nickel's mid-low stacking fault energy. Godasu, Prakash, and Mula found that in compression tests with constant strain rate, the recrystallization rate of Inconel 625 is controlled by the formation of Σ3 twins at the interface of migrating high angle grain boundaries. These recrystallization twins eventually form dynamically recrystallized grains. In addition, they found that carbides inside Inconel 625 can be nucleation sites for dynamic recrystallization due to their incoherency.

Using Inconel 625 under tension above 923 K can result in the formation of deleterious precipitates, according to Mathew et al. At 973 K, γ″ forms inside the grains, which eventually decomposes into δ-phase at higher temperatures, with δ solutionizing back into the matrix at temperatures between 1123 and 1148 K. These phase transformations take place mostly within the grain. Mathew et al. reports that the stress during creep accelerates the nucleation of these precipitates due to the excess dislocations and vacancies from tensile deformation. In another study, Mathew et al. reports that at the temperatures where these precipitates are formed, the elongation at rupture is about half as when the precipitates are solutionized. This indicates that δ is strongly embrittling Inconel 625 when it develops in the microstructure.

== Use in Additive Manufacturing ==
Inconel 625 is an alloy used for crucial applications in the nuclear and aerospace sectors, making it an appealing alloy to target for the use of additive manufacturing processes, to reduce material waste, and increase part complexity, and potentially allowing for finer control of the microstructure. Kumar et al. demonstrated that Inconel 625 manufactured through Directed Energy Deposition (DED). DED alloys have high temperature gradients throughout the build, leading to residual stresses within the alloy. In addition, using the printing parameters set by Kumar et al. resulted in dendrites growing within the Inconel 625, causing superior strength, but worse ductility when compared to cast Inconel 625. Heat treatment was found to reduce these residual stresses, as well as increase the ductility of the alloy.

Different additive manufacturing methods result in different microstructures. Gamon et al. demonstrated a variety of microstructures in Inconel 625 when making the alloy with a various additive manufacturing techniques. Grain morphology included flattened particles, columnar/dendrites, fully equiaxed, columnar grains, and delta needles within columnar/dendritic grains. The size of the grains were also dictated by the technique used. This study demonstrates the versatility of Inconel 625, and its ability to be processed in different ways, depending on the application needed.

As expected, microstructures resulting in smaller grain sizes exhibited higher microhardness at room temperature, due to the Hall-Petch effect.

== ASTM Specifications ==
ASTM (American Society for Testing and Materials) for various products made out of Inconel 625 are as follows:

Pipe Seamless	Pipe Welded	Tube Seamless	Tube Welded	Sheet/Plate	Bar	Forging	Fitting	Wire
B444	B705	B444	B704	B443	B446	–	–	–

== Markets ==
Markets for Inconel 625 include:

- Offshore
- Marine
- Nuclear
- Chemical Processing
- Aerospace
- Glow Plugs

== Applications ==
Product and technology applications of Inconel 625 include:

- Seawater components
- Flare stacks
- Aircraft ducting systems
- Specialized seawater equipment
- Chemical process equipment
- Turbine shroud rings
- Engine thrust-reverser systems
- Jet engine exhausts systems
- Boiler furnaces

Inconel 625 is commonly fabricated into pipes, plates, flanges, and bars due to its excellent weldability and high formability, making it ideal for applications such as offshore pipe systems, heat exchangers, chemical transport lines, and gas turbine ducting systems.

== Specifications ==
Specifications and certifications include:

- AMS: 5599, 5666, 5837, 5869
- MS: 5837
- ASME: SB 443 Gr 1, SB 446 Gr 1
- ASTM: B 443 Gr 1, B 446 Gr 1
- EN: 2.4856
- ISO: 15156-3
- NACE: MR0175-3
- UNS: N06625
- Werkstoff: 2.4856

== See also ==
- Inconel
- Incoloy
- Monel
- Hastelloy
- Nimonic
