= Exfoliation corrosion (metallurgy) =

Intergranular corrosion causing delamination of the metal surface

In metallurgy, exfoliation corrosion (also called lamellar corrosion) is a severe type of intergranular corrosion that raises surface grains from metal by forming corrosion products at grain boundaries under the surface. It is frequently found on extruded sections where grain thickness is not as thick as the rolled grain. It can affect aircraft structures, marine vessels, heaters and other objects.
