= Grain boundary strengthening =

Method of strengthening materials by changing grain size

Figure 1: Hall–Petch strengthening is limited by the size of dislocations. Once the grain size reaches about 10 nanometres (3.9×10^{−7} in), grain boundaries start to slide.

In materials science, grain-boundary strengthening (or Hall–Petch strengthening) is a method of strengthening materials by changing their average crystallite (grain) size. It is based on the observation that grain boundaries are insurmountable borders for dislocations and that the number of dislocations within a grain has an effect on how stress builds up in the adjacent grain, which will eventually activate dislocation sources and thus enabling deformation in the neighbouring grain as well. By changing grain size, one can influence the number of dislocations piled up at the grain boundary and yield strength. For example, heat treatment after plastic deformation and changing the rate of solidification are ways to alter grain size.

== Theory ==
In grain-boundary strengthening, the grain boundaries act as pinning points impeding further dislocation propagation. Since the lattice structure of adjacent grains differs in orientation, it requires more energy for a dislocation to change directions and move into the adjacent grain. The grain boundary is also much more disordered than inside the grain, which also prevents the dislocations from moving in a continuous slip plane. Impeding this dislocation movement will hinder the onset of plasticity and hence increase the yield strength of the material.

Under an applied stress, existing dislocations and dislocations generated by Frank–Read sources will move through a crystalline lattice until encountering a grain boundary, where the large atomic mismatch between different grains creates a repulsive stress field to oppose continued dislocation motion. As more dislocations propagate to this boundary, dislocation 'pile up' occurs as a cluster of dislocations are unable to move past the boundary. As dislocations generate repulsive stress fields, each successive dislocation will apply a repulsive force to the dislocation incident with the grain boundary. These repulsive forces act as a driving force to reduce the energetic barrier for diffusion across the boundary, such that additional pile up causes dislocation diffusion across the grain boundary, allowing further deformation in the material. Decreasing grain size decreases the amount of possible pile up at the boundary, increasing the amount of applied stress necessary to move a dislocation across a grain boundary. The higher the applied stress needed to move the dislocation, the higher the yield strength. Thus, there is then an inverse relationship between grain size and yield strength, as demonstrated by the Hall–Petch equation. However, when there is a large direction change in the orientation of the two adjacent grains, the dislocation may not necessarily move from one grain to the other but instead create a new source of dislocation in the adjacent grain. The theory remains the same that more grain boundaries create more opposition to dislocation movement and in turn strengthens the material.

There is a limit to this mode of strengthening, as infinitely strong materials do not exist. Grain sizes can range from about 100 μm (0.0039 in) (large grains) to 1 μm (3.9×10^{−5} in) (small grains). Lower than this, the size of dislocations begins to approach the size of the grains. At a grain size of about 10 nm (3.9×10^{−7} in), only one or two dislocations can fit inside a grain (see Figure 1 above). This scheme prohibits dislocation pile-up and instead results in grain boundary diffusion. The lattice resolves the applied stress by grain boundary sliding, resulting in a decrease in the material's yield strength.

To understand the mechanism of grain boundary strengthening one must understand the nature of dislocation-dislocation interactions. Dislocations create a stress field around them given by:

$$\sigma \propto \frac{Gb} r,$$

where G is the material's shear modulus, b is the Burgers vector, and r is the distance from the dislocation. If the dislocations are in the right alignment with respect to each other, the local stress fields they create will repel each other. This helps dislocation movement along grains and across grain boundaries. Hence, the more dislocations are present in a grain, the greater the stress field felt by a dislocation near a grain boundary:

$$\tau_\text{felt} = \tau_\text{applied} + n_\text{dislocation} \tau_\text{dislocation} \,$$

Interphase boundaries can also contribute to grain boundary strengthening, particularly in composite materials and precipitation-hardened alloys. Coherent IPBs, in particular, can provide additional barriers to dislocation motion, similar to grain boundaries. In contrast, non-coherent IPBs and partially coherent IPBs can act as sources of dislocations, which can lead to localized deformation and affect the mechanical properties of the material.

This is a schematic roughly illustrating the concept of dislocation pile-up and how it affects the strength of the material. A material with larger grain size is able to have more dislocations pile up, leading to a bigger driving force for dislocations to move from one grain to another. Thus you will have to apply less force to move a dislocation from a larger than from a smaller grain, leading materials with smaller grains to exhibit higher yield stress.

=== Subgrain strengthening ===
A subgrain is a part of the grain that is only slightly disoriented from other parts of the grain. Current research is being done to see the effect of subgrain strengthening in materials. Depending on the processing of the material, subgrains can form within the grains of the material. For example, when Fe-based material is ball-milled for long periods of time (e.g. 100+ hours), subgrains of 60–90 nm are formed. It has been shown that the higher the density of the subgrains, the higher the yield stress of the material due to the increased subgrain boundary. The strength of the metal was found to vary reciprocally with the size of the subgrain, which is analogous to the Hall–Petch equation. The subgrain boundary strengthening also has a breakdown point of around a subgrain size of 0.1 μm, which is the size where any subgrains smaller than that size would decrease yield strength.

== Types of Strengthening Boundaries ==
=== Coherent Interphase Boundaries ===
Coherent grain boundaries are those in which the crystal lattice of adjacent grains is continuous across the boundary. In other words, the crystallographic orientation of the grains on either side of the boundary is related by a small rotation or translation. Coherent grain boundaries are typically observed in materials with small grain sizes or in highly ordered materials such as single crystals. Because the crystal lattice is continuous across the boundary, there are no defects or dislocations associated with coherent grain boundaries. As a result, they do not act as barriers to the motion of dislocations and have little effect on the strength of a material. However, they can still affect other properties such as diffusion and grain growth.

When solid solutions become supersaturated and precipitation occurs, tiny particles are formed. These particles typically have interphase boundaries that match up with the matrix, despite differences in interatomic spacing between the particle and the matrix. This creates a coherency strain, which causes distortion. Dislocations respond to the stress field of a coherent particle in a way similar to how they interact with solute atoms of different sizes. It is worth noting that the interfacial energy can also influence the kinetics of phase transformations and precipitation processes. For instance, the energy associated with a strained coherent interface can reach a critical level as the precipitate grows, leading to a transition from a coherent to a disordered (non-coherent) interface. This transition occurs when the energy associated with maintaining the coherency becomes too high, and the system seeks a lower energy configuration. This happens when particle dispersion is introduced into a matrix. Dislocations pass through small particles and bow between large particles or particles with disordered interphase boundaries. The predominant slip mechanism determines the contribution to strength, which depends on factors such as particle size and volume fraction.

=== Partially-coherent Interphase Boundaries ===
A partially coherent interphase boundary is an intermediate type of IPB that lies between the completely coherent and non-coherent IPBs. In this type of boundary, there is a partial match between the atomic arrangements of the particle and the matrix, but not a perfect match. As a result, coherency strains are partially relieved, but not completely eliminated. The periodic introduction of dislocations along the boundary plays a key role in partially relieving the coherency strains. These dislocations act as periodic defects that accommodate the lattice mismatch between the particle and the matrix. The dislocations can be introduced during the precipitation process or during subsequent annealing treatments.

=== Non-coherent Interphase Boundaries ===
Incoherent grain boundaries are those in which there is a significant mismatch in crystallographic orientation between adjacent grains. This results in a discontinuity in the crystal lattice across the boundary, and the formation of a variety of defects such as dislocations, stacking faults, and grain boundary ledges.The presence of these defects creates a barrier to the motion of dislocations and leads to a strengthening effect. This effect is more pronounced in materials with smaller grain sizes, as there are more grain boundaries to impede dislocation motion. In addition to the barrier effect, incoherent grain boundaries can also act as sources and sinks for dislocations. This can lead to localized plastic deformation and affect the overall mechanical response of a material.

When small particles are formed through precipitation from supersaturated solid solutions, their interphase boundaries may not be coherent with the matrix. In such cases, the atomic bonds do not match up across the interface and there is a misfit between the particle and the matrix. This misfit gives rise to a non-coherency strain, which can cause the formation of dislocations at the grain boundary. As a result, the properties of the small particle can be different from those of the matrix. The size at which non-coherent grain boundaries form depends on the lattice misfit and the interfacial energy.

== Interfacial Energy ==
Understanding the interfacial energy of materials with different types of interphase boundaries (IPBs) provides valuable insights into several aspects of their behavior, including thermodynamic stability, deformation behavior, and phase evolution.

=== Grain Boundary Sliding and Dislocation Transmission ===
Interfacial energy affects the mechanisms of grain boundary sliding and dislocation transmission. Higher interfacial energy promotes greater resistance to grain boundary sliding, as the higher energy barriers inhibit the relative movement of adjacent grains. Additionally, dislocations that encounter grain boundaries can either transmit across the boundary or be reflected back into the same grain. The interfacial energy influences the likelihood of dislocation transmission, with higher interfacial energy barriers impeding dislocation motion and enhancing grain boundary strengthening.

=== Grain Boundary Orientation ===
High-angle grain boundaries, which have large misorientations between adjacent grains, tend to have higher interfacial energy and are more effective in impeding dislocation motion. In contrast, low-angle grain boundaries with small misorientations and lower interfacial energy may allow for easier dislocation transmission and exhibit weaker grain boundary strengthening effects.

=== Grain Boundary Engineering ===
Grain boundary engineering involves manipulating the grain boundary structure and energy to enhance mechanical properties. By controlling the interfacial energy, it is possible to engineer materials with desirable grain boundary characteristics, such as increased interfacial area, higher grain boundary density, or specific grain boundary types.

- Alloying

Introducing alloying elements into the material can alter the interfacial energy of grain boundaries. Alloying can result in segregation of solute atoms at the grain boundaries, which can modify the atomic arrangements and bonding, and thereby influence the interfacial energy.

- Surface Treatments and Coatings

Applying surface treatments or coatings can modify the interfacial energy of grain boundaries. Surface modification techniques, such as chemical treatments or deposition of thin films, can alter the surface energy and consequently affect the grain boundary energy.

- Heat Treatments and Annealing

Thermal treatments can be employed to modify the interfacial energy of grain boundaries. Annealing at specific temperatures and durations can induce atomic rearrangements, diffusion, and stress relaxation at the grain boundaries, leading to changes in the interfacial energy.

Once the interfacial energy is controlled, grain boundaries can be manipulated to enhance their strengthening effects.

- Severe plastic deformation

Applying severe plastic deformation techniques, such as equal-channel angular pressing (ECAP) or high-pressure torsion (HPT), can lead to grain refinement and the creation of new grain boundaries with tailored characteristics. These refined grain structures can exhibit a high density of grain boundaries, including high-angle boundaries, which can contribute to enhanced grain boundary strengthening.

- Thermomechanical processing

Utilizing specific thermomechanical processing routes, such as rolling, forging, or extrusion, can result in the creation of a desired texture and the development of specific grain boundary structures. These processing routes can promote the formation of specific grain boundary types and orientations, leading to improved grain boundary strengthening.

== Hall Petch relationship ==
Hall–Petch constants
| Material | σ_{0} [MPa] | k [MPa m^{1/2}] |
|---|---|---|
| Copper | 25 | 0.12 |
| Titanium | 80 | 0.40 |
| Mild steel | 70 | 0.74 |
| Ni_{3}Al | 300 | 1.70 |

There is an inverse relationship between delta yield strength and grain size to some power, x.

$$\Delta \tau \propto {k \over d^x}$$

where k is the strengthening coefficient and both k and x are material specific. Assuming a narrow monodisperse grain size distribution in a polycrystalline material, the smaller the grain size, the smaller the repulsion stress felt by a grain boundary dislocation and the higher the applied stress needed to propagate dislocations through the material.

The relation between yield stress and grain size is described mathematically by the Hall–Petch equation:

$$\sigma_\text{y} = \sigma_0 + {k_\text{y} \over \sqrt {d}}$$

where σ_{y} is the yield stress, σ_{0} is a materials constant for the starting stress for dislocation movement (or the resistance of the lattice to dislocation motion), k_{y} is the strengthening coefficient (a constant specific to each material), and d is the average grain diameter. The H-P relationship is an empirical fit to experimental data, and that the notion that a pileup length of half the grain diameter causes a critical stress for transmission to or generation in an adjacent grain has not been verified by actual observation in the microstructure.

Theoretically, a material could be made infinitely strong if the grains are made infinitely small. This is impossible though, because the lower limit of grain size is a single unit cell of the material. Even then, if the grains of a material are the size of a single unit cell, then the material is in fact amorphous, not crystalline, since there is no long range order, and dislocations can not be defined in an amorphous material. It has been observed experimentally that the microstructure with the highest yield strength is a grain size of about 10 nm (3.9×10^{−7} in), because grains smaller than this undergo another yielding mechanism, grain boundary sliding. Producing engineering materials with this ideal grain size is difficult because only thin films can be reliably produced with grains of this size. In materials having a bi-disperse grain size distribution, for example those exhibiting abnormal grain growth, hardening mechanisms do not strictly follow the Hall–Petch relationship and divergent behavior is observed.

=== History ===
In the early 1950s two groundbreaking series of papers were written independently on the relationship between grain boundaries and strength.

In 1951, while at the University of Sheffield, E. O. Hall wrote three papers which appeared in volume 64 of the Proceedings of the Physical Society. In his third paper, Hall showed that the length of slip bands or crack lengths correspond to grain sizes and thus a relationship could be established between the two. Hall concentrated on the yielding properties of mild steels.

Based on his experimental work carried out in 1946–1949, N. J. Petch of the University of Leeds, England published a paper in 1953 independent from Hall's. Petch's paper concentrated more on brittle fracture. By measuring the variation in cleavage strength with respect to ferritic grain size at very low temperatures, Petch found a relationship exact to that of Hall's. Thus this important relationship is named after both Hall and Petch.

== Reverse or inverse Hall Petch relation ==
The Hall–Petch relation predicts that as the grain size decreases the yield strength increases. The Hall–Petch relation was experimentally found to be an effective model for materials with grain sizes ranging from 1 millimeter to 1 micrometer. Consequently, it was believed that if average grain size could be decreased even further to the nanometer length scale the yield strength would increase as well. However, experiments on many nanocrystalline materials demonstrated that if the grains reached a small enough size, the critical grain size which is typically around 10 nm (3.9×10^{−7} in), the yield strength would either remain constant or decrease with decreasing grains size. This phenomenon has been termed the reverse or inverse Hall–Petch relation. A number of different mechanisms have been proposed for this relation. As suggested by Carlton et al., they fall into four categories: (1) dislocation-based, (2) diffusion-based, (3) grain-boundary shearing-based, (4) two-phase-based.

There have been several works done to investigate the mechanism behind the inverse Hall–Petch relationship on numerous materials. In Han's work, a series of molecular dynamics simulations were done to investigate the effect of grain size on the mechanical properties of nanocrystalline graphene under uniaxial tensile loading, with random shapes and random orientations of graphene rings. The simulation was run at grain sizes of nm and at room temperature. It was found that in the grain size of range 3.1 nm to 40 nm, inverse Hall–Petch relationship was observed. This is because when the grain size decreases at nm scale, there is an increase in the density of grain boundary junctions which serves as a source of crack growth or weak bonding. However, it was also observed that at grain size below 3.1 nm, a pseudo Hall–Petch relationship was observed, which results an increase in strength. This is due to a decrease in stress concentration of grain boundary junctions and also due to the stress distribution of 5-7 defects along the grain boundary where the compressive and tensile stress are produced by the pentagon and heptagon rings, etc. Chen at al. have done research on the inverse HallPetch relations of high-entropy CoNiFeAl_{x}Cu_{1–x} alloys. In the work, polycrystalline models of FCC structured CoNiFeAl_{0.3}Cu_{0.7} with grain sizes ranging from 7.2 nm to 18.8 nm were constructed to perform uniaxial compression using molecular dynamic simulations. All compression simulations were done after setting the periodic boundary conditions across the three orthogonal directions. It was found that when the grain size is below 12.1 nm the inverse Hall–Petch relation was observed. This is because as the grain size decreases partial dislocations become less prominent and so as deformation twinning. Instead, it was observed that there is a change in the grain orientation and migration of grain boundaries and thus cause the growth and shrinkage of neighboring grains. These are the mechanisms for inverse Hall–Petch relations. Sheinerman et al. also studied inverse Hall–Petch relation for nanocrystalline ceramics. It was found that the critical grain size for the transition from direct Hall–Petch to inverse Hall–Petch fundamentally depends on the activation energy of grain boundary sliding. This is because in direct Hall–Petch the dominant deformation mechanism is intragrain dislocation motion while in inverse Hall–Petch the dominant mechanism is grain boundary sliding. It was concluded that by plotting both the volume fraction of grain boundary sliding and volume fraction of intragrain dislocation motion as a function of grain size, the critical grain size could be found where the two curves cross.

Other explanations that have been proposed to rationalize the apparent softening of metals with nanosized grains include poor sample quality and the suppression of dislocation pileups.

The pileup of dislocations at grain boundaries is a hallmark mechanism of the Hall–Petch relationship. Once grain sizes drop below the equilibrium distance between dislocations, though, this relationship should no longer be valid. Nevertheless, it is not entirely clear what exactly the dependency of yield stress should be on grain sizes below this point.

== Grain refinement ==
Grain refinement, also known as inoculation, is the set of techniques used to implement grain boundary strengthening in metallurgy. The specific techniques and corresponding mechanisms will vary based on what materials are being considered.

One method for controlling grain size in aluminum alloys is by introducing particles to serve as nucleants, such as Al–5%Ti. Grains will grow via heterogeneous nucleation; that is, for a given degree of undercooling beneath the melting temperature, aluminum particles in the melt will nucleate on the surface of the added particles. Grains will grow in the form of dendrites growing radially away from the surface of the nucleant. Solute particles can then be added (called grain refiners) which limit the growth of dendrites, leading to grain refinement. Al-Ti-B alloys are the most common grain refiner for Al alloys; however, novel refiners such as Al_{3}Sc have been suggested.

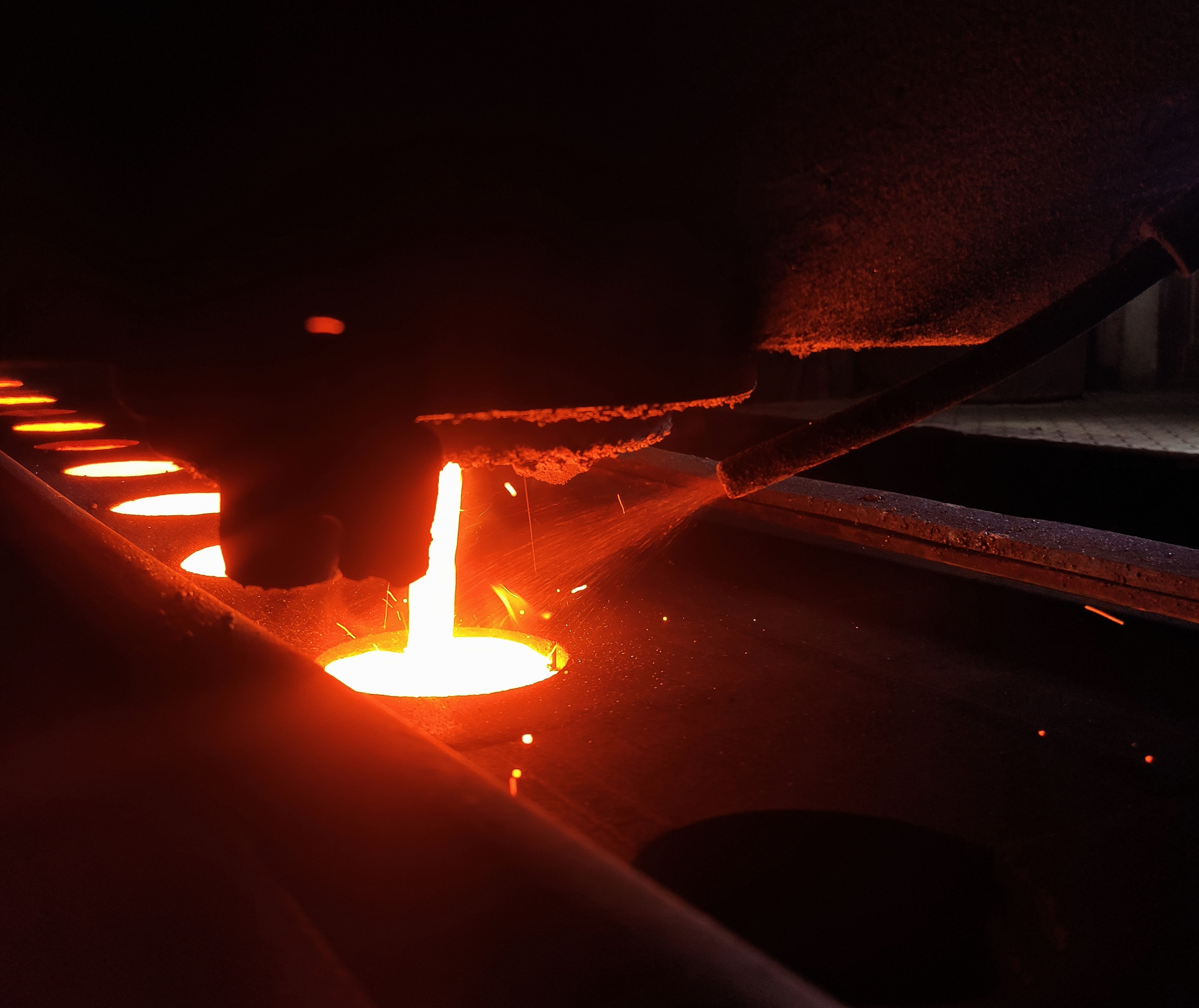
In-stream inoculation addition while molten cast iron is poured to a green sand mold in a foundry

One common technique is to induce a very small fraction of the melt to solidify at a much higher temperature than the rest, which will generate seed crystals that act as a template when the rest of the material falls to its (lower) melting temperature and begins to solidify. Since a huge number of minuscule seed crystals are present, a nearly equal number of crystallites result, and the size of any one grain is limited.

Typical inoculants for various casting alloys
| Metal | Inoculant |
|---|---|
| Cast iron | FeSi, SiCa, graphite |
| Mg alloys | Zr, C |
| Cu alloys | Fe, Co, Zr |
| Al-Si alloys | P, Ti, B, Sc |
| Pb alloys | As, Te |
| Zn alloys | Ti |
| Ti alloys | Al–Ti intermetallics |

== See also ==
- Strengthening mechanisms of materials
