= Reactive magnesia =

Reactive magnesia is also variously known as caustic calcined magnesia, caustic magnesia or CCM. The temperature of firing has a greater influence on reactivity than grind size as excess energy goes into lattice energy.

Crystalline magnesium oxide, or periclase, has a calculated lattice energy of 3795 kJ mol-1 which must be overcome for it to go into solution or for reaction to occur.

Reactive magnesia is essentially amorphous magnesia with low lattice energy and is made at low temperatures and finely ground.

CCM is manufactured worldwide. China supplies low-cost, low-purity (~90% MgO) CCM. Turkey (KUMAS) and Australia (Causmag) supply high-purity (~95% MgO) CCM. Low-purity CCM is used in industrial applications such as waste water treatment. High-purity CCM is used in pharmaceuticals, cattle feed supplement, fertilizer, adhesive, Tyre, Magnetic Material etc.
