= Stress field =

Distribution of internal forces in a body that balance a given set of external forces

A stress field is the distribution of internal forces in a body that balance a given set of external forces. Stress fields are widely used in fluid dynamics and materials science. Consider that one can picture the stress fields as the stress created by adding an extra half plane of atoms to a crystal. The bonds are stretched around the location of the dislocation and this stretching causes the stress field to form. Atomic bonds further and further away from the dislocation centre are less and less stretched which is why the stress field dissipates as the distance from the dislocation centre increases. Each dislocation within the material has a stress field associated with it. The creation of these stress fields is a result of the material trying to dissipate mechanical energy that is being exerted on the material. By convention, these dislocations are labelled as either positive or negative depending on whether the stress field of the dislocation is mostly compressive or tensile.

By modelling of dislocations and their stress fields as either a positive (compressive field) or negative (tensile field) charges, we can understand how dislocations interact with each other in the lattice. If two like fields come into contact with one another they will be repelled by one another. On the other hand, if two opposing charges come into contact with one another they will be attracted to one another. These two interactions will both strengthen the material in different ways. If two equivalently charged fields come in contact and are confined to a particular region, excessive force is required to overcome the repulsive forces needed to elicit dislocation movement past one another. If two oppositely charged fields come into contact with one another they will merge with one another to form a jog. A jog can be modelled as a potential well that traps dislocations. Thus, excessive force is needed to pull the dislocations apart. Since dislocation motion is the primary mechanism behind plastic deformation, increasing the stress required to move dislocations directly increases the yield strength of the material.

The theory of stress fields can be applied to various strengthening mechanisms for materials. Stress fields can be created by adding different sized atoms to the lattice (solute strengthening). If a smaller atom is added to the lattice, a tensile stress field is created. The atomic bonds are longer due to the smaller radius of the solute atom. Similarly, if a larger atom is added to the lattice, a compressive stress field is created. The atomic bonds are shorter due to the larger radius of the solute atom. The stress fields created by adding solute atoms form the basis of the material strengthening process that occurs in alloys.
