= Transgranular fracture =

Crack which propagates through a material's grains

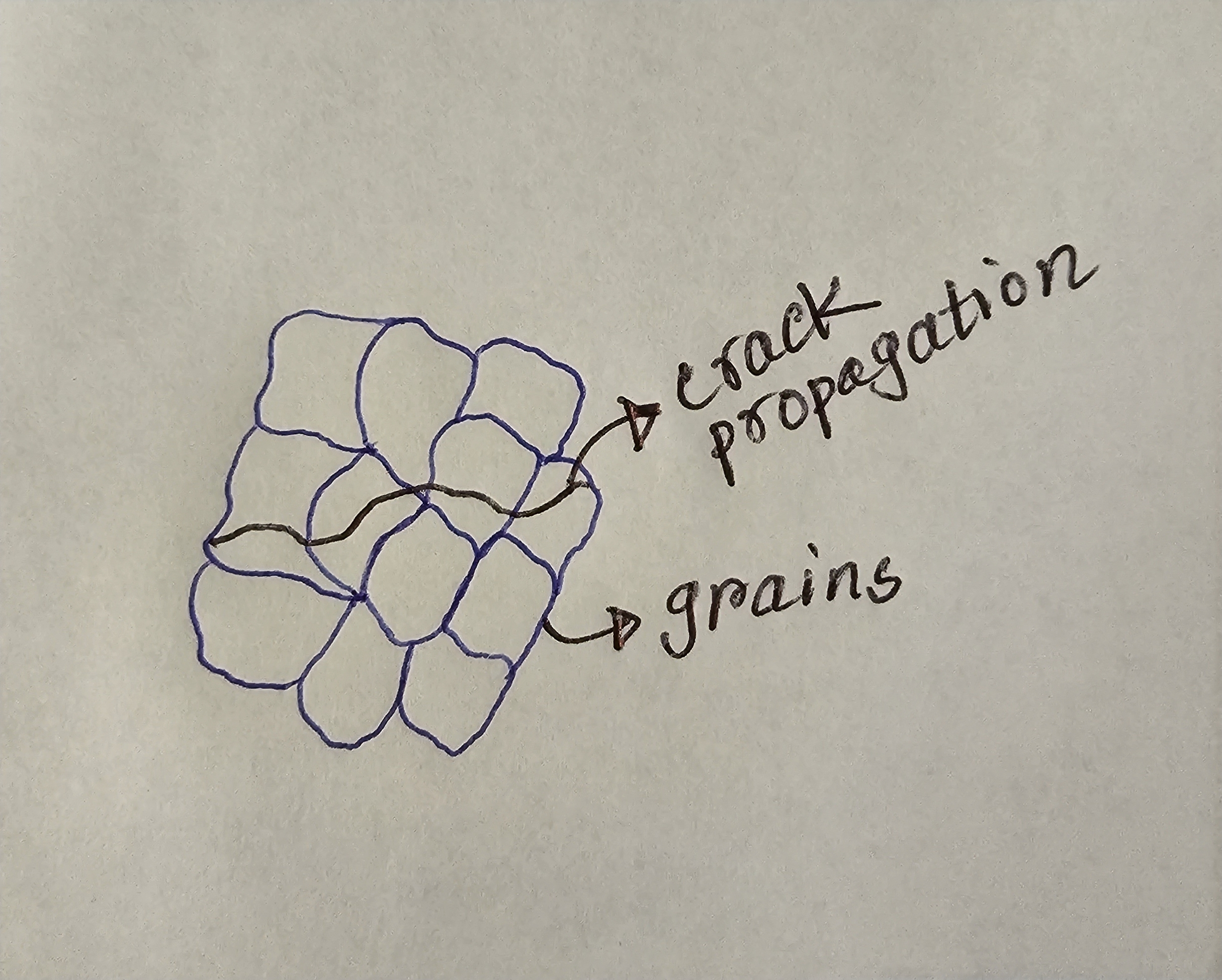

In fracture mechanics, transgranular fracture is a type of fracture that occurs through the crystal grains of a material. In contrast to intergranular fractures, which occur when a fracture follows the grain boundaries, this type of fracture traverses the material's microstructure directly through individual grains. This type of fracture typically results from a combination of high stresses and material defects, such as voids or inclusions, that create a path for crack propagation through the grains. A broad range of ductile or brittle materials, including metals, ceramics, and polymers, can experience transgranular fracture. When examined under scanning electron microscopy, this type of fracture reveals cleavage steps, river patterns, feather markings, dimples, and tongues. The fracture may change directions somewhat when entering a new grain in order to follow the new lattice orientation of that grain but this is a less severe direction change then would be required to follow the grain boundary. This results in a fairly smooth-looking fracture with fewer sharp edges than one that follows the grain boundaries. This can be visualized as a jigsaw puzzle cut from a single sheet of wood with the wood grain showing. A transgranular fracture follows the grains in the wood, not the jigsaw edges of the puzzle pieces. This is in contrast to an intergranular fracture which, in this analogy, would follow the jigsaw edges, not the wood grain.

== Mechanism of transgranular fracture ==
The mechanism of transgranular fracture may vary depending on the material and surrounding conditions under which the fracture occurs. However, some general steps are typically involved in the transgranular fracture process:

- Crack initiation: The first step in transgranular fracture is the initiation of a crack within the material. This can be caused by a range of factors, such as manufacturing defects, surface defects, or exposure to high-stress conditions.
- Crack propagation: Once the crack has initiated, it may spread throughout the material as a result of stress concentrations and other factors.
- Plastic deformation: As the crack propagates, the material near the crack undergoes significant plastic deformation due to the local stress concentration. This deformation may lead to small voids or defects within the material, further promoting crack propagation.
- Void coalescence: As the crack propagates, these small voids can grow and merge, forming larger voids or cavities within the material. These voids can further weaken the material and promote the propagation of the crack.
- Final rupture: Eventually, the combined effects of crack propagation, plastic deformation, and void coalescence can lead to the final break of the material, resulting in transgranular fracture.

In ductile metals, the plastic deformation of the material can be a critical factor in the transgranular fracture process, while in brittle materials such as ceramics, the formation and growth of cracks can be influenced by factors such as grain size, porosity, and the presence of impurities or other defects.

== Factors affecting transgranular fracture ==
- Temperature: The temperature at which a material is loaded can also affect the occurrence and characteristics of transgranular fractures. In some materials, the occurrence of transgranular fracture may increase at lower temperatures due to increased embrittlement or reduced ductility.
- Presence of defects or inclusions: As mentioned earlier, the presence of voids or inclusions within a material can create localized areas of stress concentration and weaken the material, making it more susceptible to transgranular fracture. The size, shape, and orientation of these defects can all affect the likelihood and severity of fracture.
- Environmental factors: The presence of certain gases, liquids, or other environmental factors can also affect the likelihood of transgranular fracture. For example, hydrogen embrittlement can cause transgranular fractures in some materials by weakening the material at a microscopic level.
- Surface conditions: The surface condition of a material, including the presence of scratches, cracks, or other defects, can also affect the occurrence and path of transgranular fracture.
- Loading conditions: High-stress concentrations, rapid loading rates, and cyclic loading can all increase the likelihood of transgranular fractures. The direction of the applied stress can also influence the orientation and path of the crack propagation.

== Transition from intergranular to transgranular fracture ==
The fracture behavior of materials can be significantly changed by the use of precipitation-based grain boundary design. For example, Meindlhumer et al. produced a thin film of AlCrN containing a specific distribution of precipitates within the grain boundaries in precipitation-based grain boundary design. The precipitates acted as a barrier to crack propagation, increasing the material's resistance to intergranular cracking. Additionally, the precipitates altered the stress distribution within the material, promoting transgranular crack propagation instead. Furthermore, smaller precipitates with a more uniform distribution have been shown to be more effective at promoting transgranular fracture.
