= Intergranular fracture =

Material fracture which propagates along grain boundaries

In fracture mechanics, intergranular fracture, intergranular cracking or intergranular embrittlement occurs when a crack propagates along the grain boundaries of a material, usually when these grain boundaries are weakened. The more commonly seen transgranular fracture occurs when the crack grows through the material grains. As an analogy, in a wall of bricks, intergranular fracture would correspond to a fracture that takes place in the mortar that keeps the bricks together.

Intergranular cracking is likely to occur if there is a hostile environmental influence and is favored by larger grain sizes and higher stresses. Intergranular cracking is possible over a wide range of temperatures. While transgranular cracking is favored by strain localization (which in turn is encouraged by smaller grain sizes), intergranular fracture is promoted by strain homogenization resulting from coarse grains.

Intergranular fracture produced by crack propagation along grain boundaries

Embrittlement, or loss of ductility, is often accompanied by a change in fracture mode from transgranular to intergranular fracture. This transition is particularly significant in the mechanism of impurity-atom embrittlement. Additionally, hydrogen embrittlement is a common category of embrittlement in which intergranular fracture can be observed.

Intergranular fracture can occur in a wide variety of materials, including steel alloys, copper alloys, aluminum alloys, and ceramics. In metals with multiple lattice orientations, when one lattice ends and another begins, the fracture changes direction to follow the new grain. This results in a fairly jagged looking fracture with straight edges of the grain and a shiny surface may be seen. In ceramics, intergranular fractures propagate through grain boundaries, producing smooth bumpy surfaces where grains can be easily identified.

== Mechanisms of intergranular fracture ==
Though it is easy to identify intergranular cracking, pinpointing the cause is more complex as the mechanisms are more varied, compared to transgranular fracture. There are several other processes that can lead to intergranular fracture or preferential crack propagation at the grain boundaries:

- Microvoid nucleation and coalescence at inclusions or second phase particles located along grain boundaries
- Grain boundary crack and cavity formations associated with elevated temperature stress rupture conditions
- Decohesion between contiguous grains due to the presence of impurity elements at grain boundaries and in association with aggressive atmospheres such as gaseous hydrogen and liquid metals
- Stress corrosion cracking processes associated with chemical dissolution along grain boundaries
- Cyclic loading conditions
- When the material has an insufficient number of independent slip systems to accommodate plastic deformation between contiguous grains. This is also known as intercrystalline fracture or grain-boundary separation.
- More rapid diffusion along grain boundaries than along grain interiors
- Faster nucleation and growth of precipitates at the grain boundaries
- Quench cracking, or crack growth following a quenching process, is another example of intergranular fracture and almost always occurs by intergranular processes. This process of quench cracking is promoted by weakened grain boundaries and large grain sizes and additionally influenced by the temperature gradient at which quenching occurs and volume expansion during transformation.

From an energy standpoint, the energy released by intergranular crack propagation is higher than that predicted by Griffith theory, implying that the additional energy term to propagate a crack comes from a grain-boundary mechanism.

== Types of intergranular fracture ==
Intergranular fracture can be categorized into the following:

- Dimpled intergranular fracture involves cases in which microvoid coalescence occurs in grain boundaries as a result of creep cavitation or void nucleation at grain boundary precipitates. Such fracture is characterized by dimples at the surface. Dimpled intergranular fracture typically leads to low macroscopic ductility, with dimpled topology revealed at the grain facets when observed at higher magnifications (1000 to 5000x). Impurities that adsorb at the grain boundaries promote dimpled intergranular fracture.
- Intergranular brittle fracture involves cases in which the grain surfaces do not have dimples that signify microvoid coalescence. Such fracture is termed brittle due to fracture prior to plastic yielding. Causes include brittle second-phase particles at grain boundaries, impurity or atom segregation at grain boundaries, and environmentally-assisted embrittlement.
- Intergranular fatigue fracture involves cases in which the integranular fracture occurs as a result of cyclic loading, or fatigue. This specific type of intergranular fracture is often associated with improper materials processing or harsh environmental conditions where the grains are severely weakened. Stress applied at elevated temperatures (creep), grain boundary precipitates, thermal treatment causing segregation at grain boundaries, and environmentally assisted weakening of grain boundaries can lead to intergranular fatigue.

== Role of solutes and impurities ==
At room temperature, intergranular fracture is commonly associated with altered cohesion resulting from segregation of solutes or impurities at the grain boundaries. Examples of solutes known to influence intergranular fracture are sulfur, phosphorus, arsenic, and antimony specifically in steels, lead in aluminum alloys, and hydrogen in numerous structural alloys. At high impurity levels, especially in the case of hydrogen embrittlement, the likelihood of intergranular fracture is greater. Solutes like hydrogen are hypothesized to stabilize and increase the density of strain-induced vacancies, leading to microcracks and microvoids at grain boundaries.

== Role of grain boundary orientation ==
Intergranular cracking is dependent on the relative orientation of the common boundary between two grains. The path of intergranular fracture typically occurs along the highest-angle grain boundary. In a study, it was shown that cracking was never exhibited for boundaries with misorientation of up to 20 degrees, regardless of boundary type. At greater angles, large areas of cracked, uncracked, and mixed behavior were seen. The results imply that the degree of grain boundary cracking, and hence intergranular fracture, is largely determined by boundary porosity, or the amount of atomic misfit.

== See also ==
- Transgranular fracture
- Intergranular corrosion
- Crystallite
