= Crystallite =

Small crystal which forms under certain conditions

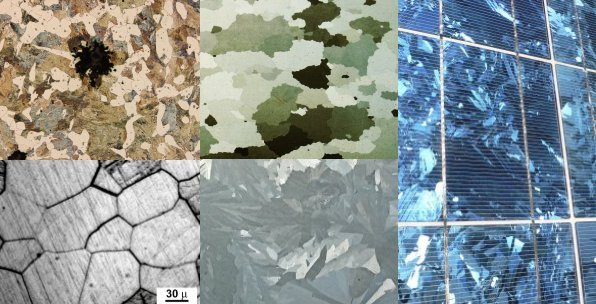
Polycrystalline structures composed of crystallites. Clockwise from top left: a) malleable iron b) electrical steel without coating c) solar cells made of multicrystalline silicon d) galvanized surface of zinc e) micrograph of acid etched metal highlighting grain boundaries

A crystallite is a small or even microscopic crystal which forms, for example, during the cooling of many materials. Crystallites are also referred to as grains.

Bacillite is a long thin needle-shaped a crystallite. It is rodlike with parallel longulites.

== Structure ==
The orientation of crystallites can be random with no preferred direction, called random texture, or directed, possibly due to growth and processing conditions. While the structure of a single crystal is highly ordered and its lattice is continuous and unbroken, amorphous materials, such as glass and many polymers, are non-crystalline and do not display any structures, as their constituents are not arranged in an ordered manner. Polycrystalline structures and paracrystalline phases are in between these two extremes. Polycrystalline materials, or polycrystals, are solids that are composed of many crystallites of varying size and orientation. Most materials are polycrystalline, made of a large number crystallites held together by thin layers of amorphous solid. Most inorganic solids are polycrystalline, including all common metals, many ceramics, rocks, and ice. A related term oligocrystalline material is a microstructure consisting of a few coarse grains, often columnar and parallel to the longitudinal ingot axis. This microstructure can be found in the ingots produced by electron beam melting.

The areas where crystallites meet are known as grain boundaries.

=== Size ===
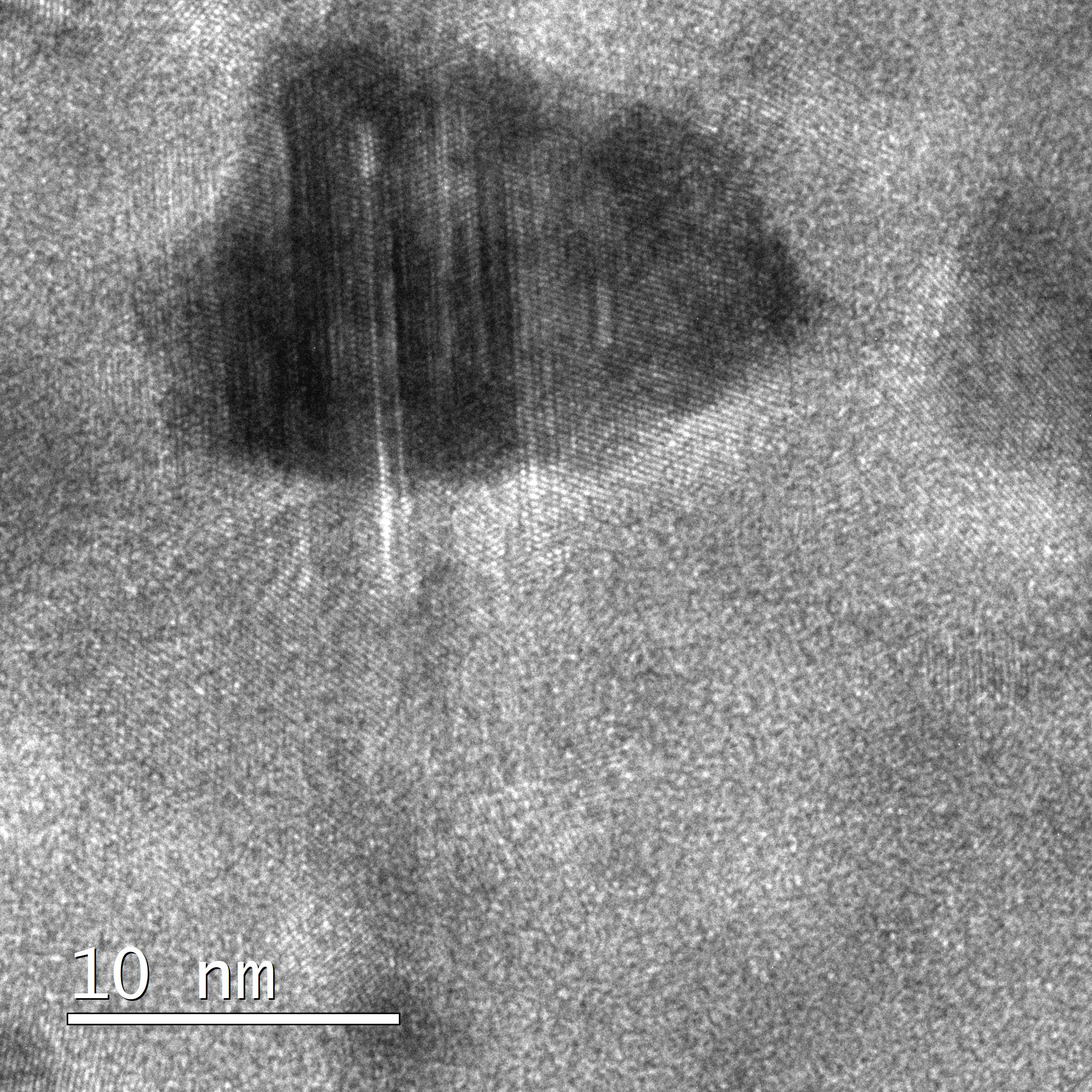
Transmission electron microscopy (TEM) bright field image of a grain in a permalloy thin film.

Crystallite size in monodisperse microstructures is usually approximated from X-ray diffraction patterns and grain size by other experimental techniques like transmission electron microscopy. Solid objects large enough to see and handle are rarely composed of a single crystal, except for a few cases (gems, silicon single crystals for the electronics industry, certain types of fiber, single crystals of a nickel-based superalloy for turbojet engines, and some ice crystals which can exceed 0.5 meters in diameter). The crystallite size can vary from a few nanometers to several millimeters.

Different degrees of ordered structures: a monocrystalline crystal, polycrystalline structure, and amorphous or non-crystalline solid

=== Effects on material physical properties ===
The extent to which a solid is crystalline (crystallinity) has important effects on its physical properties. Sulfur, while usually polycrystalline, may also occur in other allotropic forms with completely different properties. Although crystallites are referred to as grains, powder grains are different, as they can be composed of smaller polycrystalline grains themselves. Generally, polycrystals cannot be superheated; they will melt promptly once they are brought to a high enough temperature. This is because grain boundaries are amorphous, and serve as nucleation points for the liquid phase. By contrast, if no solid nucleus is present as a liquid cools, it tends to become supercooled. Since this is undesirable for mechanical materials, alloy designers often take steps against it (by grain refinement).

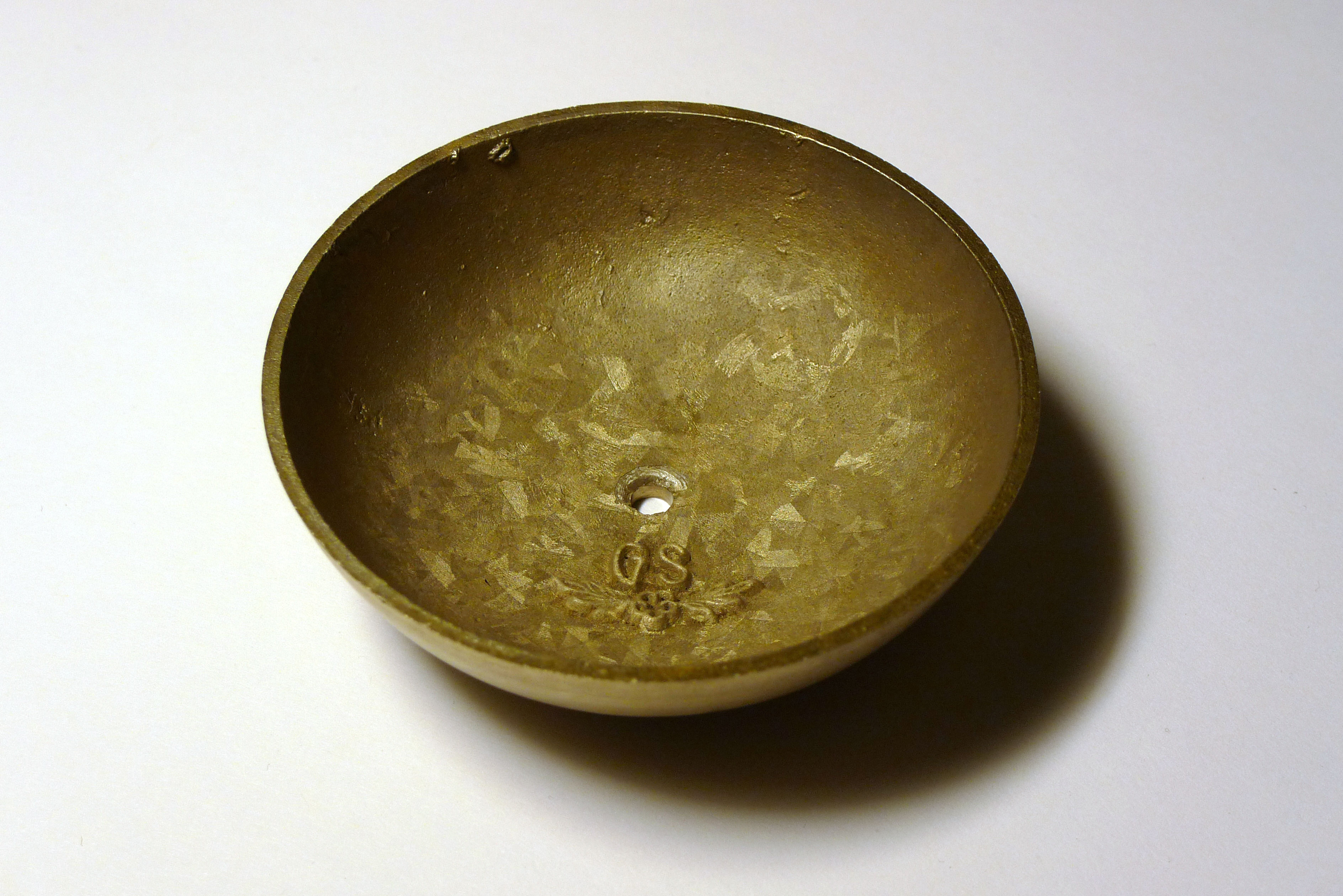
Bronze bell with large crystallites on the inside

Material fractures can be either intergranular or a transgranular fracture. There is an ambiguity with powder grains: a powder grain can be made of several crystallites. Thus, the (powder) "grain size" found by laser granulometry can be different from the "grain size" (rather, crystallite size) found by X-ray diffraction (e.g. Scherrer method), by optical microscopy under polarised light, or by scanning electron microscopy (backscattered electrons).

If the individual crystallites are oriented completely at random, a large enough volume of polycrystalline material will be approximately isotropic. This property helps the simplifying assumptions of continuum mechanics to apply to real-world solids. However, most manufactured materials have some alignment to their crystallites, resulting in texture that must be taken into account for accurate predictions of their behavior and characteristics. When the crystallites are mostly ordered with a random spread of orientations, one has a mosaic crystal. Abnormal grain growth, where a small number of crystallites are significantly larger than the mean crystallite size, is commonly observed in diverse polycrystalline materials, and results in mechanical and optical properties that diverge from similar materials having a monodisperse crystallite size distribution with a similar mean crystallite size.

Coarse grained rocks are formed very slowly, while fine grained rocks are formed quickly, on geological time scales. If a rock forms very quickly, such as from the solidification of lava ejected from a volcano, there may be no crystals at all. This is how obsidian forms.

== Grain boundaries ==
Grain boundaries are interfaces where crystals of different orientations meet. A grain boundary is a single-phase interface, with crystals on each side of the boundary being identical except in orientation. The term "crystallite boundary" is sometimes, though rarely, used. Grain boundary areas contain those atoms that have been perturbed from their original lattice sites, dislocations, and impurities that have migrated to the lower energy grain boundary.

Treating a grain boundary geometrically as an interface of a single crystal cut into two parts, one of which is rotated, we see that there are five variables required to define a grain boundary. The first two numbers come from the unit vector that specifies a rotation axis. The third number designates the angle of rotation of the grain. The final two numbers specify the plane of the grain boundary (or a unit vector that is normal to this plane).

Grain boundaries disrupt the motion of dislocations through a material. Dislocation propagation is impeded because of the stress field of the grain boundary defect region and the lack of slip planes and slip directions and overall alignment across the boundaries. Reducing grain size is therefore a common way to improve strength, often without any sacrifice in toughness because the smaller grains create more obstacles per unit area of slip plane. This crystallite size-strength relationship is given by the Hall–Petch relationship. The high interfacial energy and relatively weak bonding in grain boundaries makes them preferred sites for the onset of corrosion and for the precipitation of new phases from the solid.

Grain boundary migration plays an important role in many of the mechanisms of creep. Grain boundary migration occurs when a shear stress acts on the grain boundary plane and causes the grains to slide. This means that fine-grained materials actually have a poor resistance to creep relative to coarser grains, especially at high temperatures, because smaller grains contain more atoms in grain boundary sites. Grain boundaries also cause deformation in that they are sources and sinks of point defects. Voids in a material tend to gather in a grain boundary, and if this happens to a critical extent, the material could fracture.

During grain boundary migration, the rate determining step depends on the angle between two adjacent grains. In a small angle dislocation boundary, the migration rate depends on vacancy diffusion between dislocations. In a high angle dislocation boundary, this depends on the atom transport by single atom jumps from the shrinking to the growing grains.

Grain boundaries are generally only a few nanometers wide. In common materials, crystallites are large enough that grain boundaries account for a small fraction of the material. However, very small grain sizes are achievable. In nanocrystalline solids, grain boundaries become a significant volume fraction of the material, with profound effects on such properties as diffusion and plasticity. In the limit of small crystallites, as the volume fraction of grain boundaries approaches 100%, the material ceases to have any crystalline character, and thus becomes an amorphous solid.

Grain boundaries are also present in magnetic domains in magnetic materials. A computer hard disk, for example, is made of a hard ferromagnetic material that contains regions of atoms whose magnetic moments can be realigned by an inductive head. The magnetization varies from region to region, and the misalignment between these regions forms boundaries that are key to data storage. The inductive head measures the orientation of the magnetic moments of these domain regions and reads out either a “1” or “0”. These bits are the data being read. Grain size is important in this technology because it limits the number of bits that can fit on one hard disk. The smaller the grain sizes, the more data that can be stored.

Because of the dangers of grain boundaries in certain materials such as superalloy turbine blades, great technological leaps were made to minimize as much as possible the effect of grain boundaries in the blades. The result was directional solidification processing in which grain boundaries were eliminated by producing columnar grain structures aligned parallel to the axis of the blade, since this is usually the direction of maximum tensile stress felt by a blade during its rotation in an airplane. The resulting turbine blades consisted of a single grain, improving reliability.

== See also ==
- Abnormal grain growth
- Crystallization of polymers
- Microlite
- Polycrystalline silicon
