= Dynamic quartz recrystallization =

Process of crystal regrowth under conditions of stress and high temperature

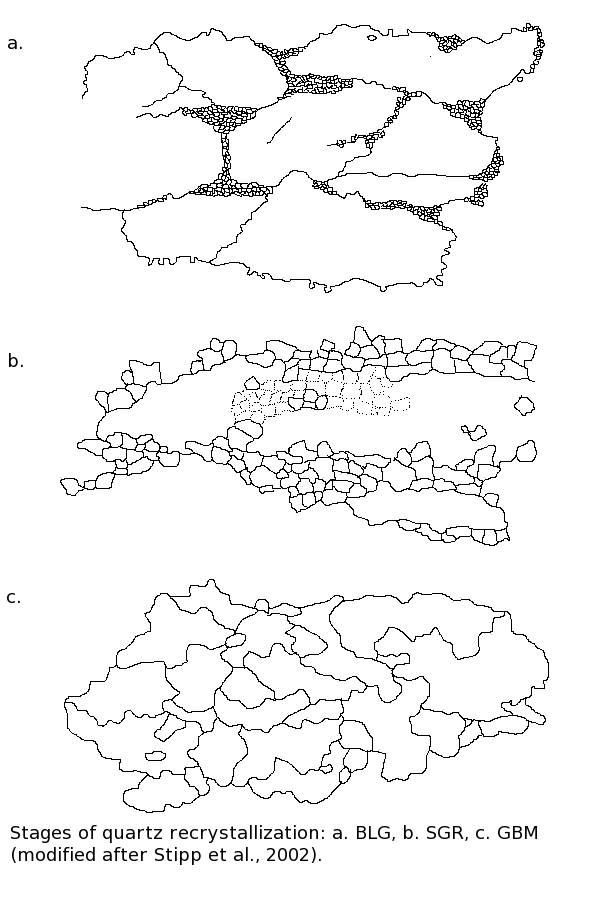

Quartz is the most abundant single mineral in the Earth's crust (although behind the feldspar group when taken collectively), and as such is present in a very large proportion of rocks both as primary crystals and as detrital grains in sedimentary and metamorphic rocks. Dynamic recrystallization is a process of crystal regrowth under conditions of stress and elevated temperature, commonly applied in the fields of metallurgy and materials science. Dynamic quartz recrystallization happens in a relatively predictable way with relation to temperature, and given its abundance quartz recrystallization can be used to easily determine relative temperature profiles, for example in orogenic belts or near intrusions.

== Mechanisms of recrystallization ==
Previous research has outlined several dislocation creep regimes present in experimental conditions. Two main mechanisms for altering grain boundaries have been defined. The first is the process by which quartz softens as temperature increases, providing a means for internal stress reduction by migration of dislocations in the crystal lattice, known as dislocation creep. These dislocations concentrate into walls, forming new grain boundaries. The other process involves differences in stored strain energy between neighboring grains, resulting in migration of existing grain boundaries. The extent to which these occur is a function of strain rate and temperature, those being, respectively, the factors controlling introduction of new dislocations and the ability of dislocations to migrate and form subgrain boundaries which themselves migrate.

== Recrystallization regimes ==
Observable microstructures in quartz can be classified into three semi-distinct groupings that form a continuum of Dynamic recrystallization textures. These regimes will be discussed in terms of temperature changes, assuming a constant level of shear.

=== Bulging recrystallization ===
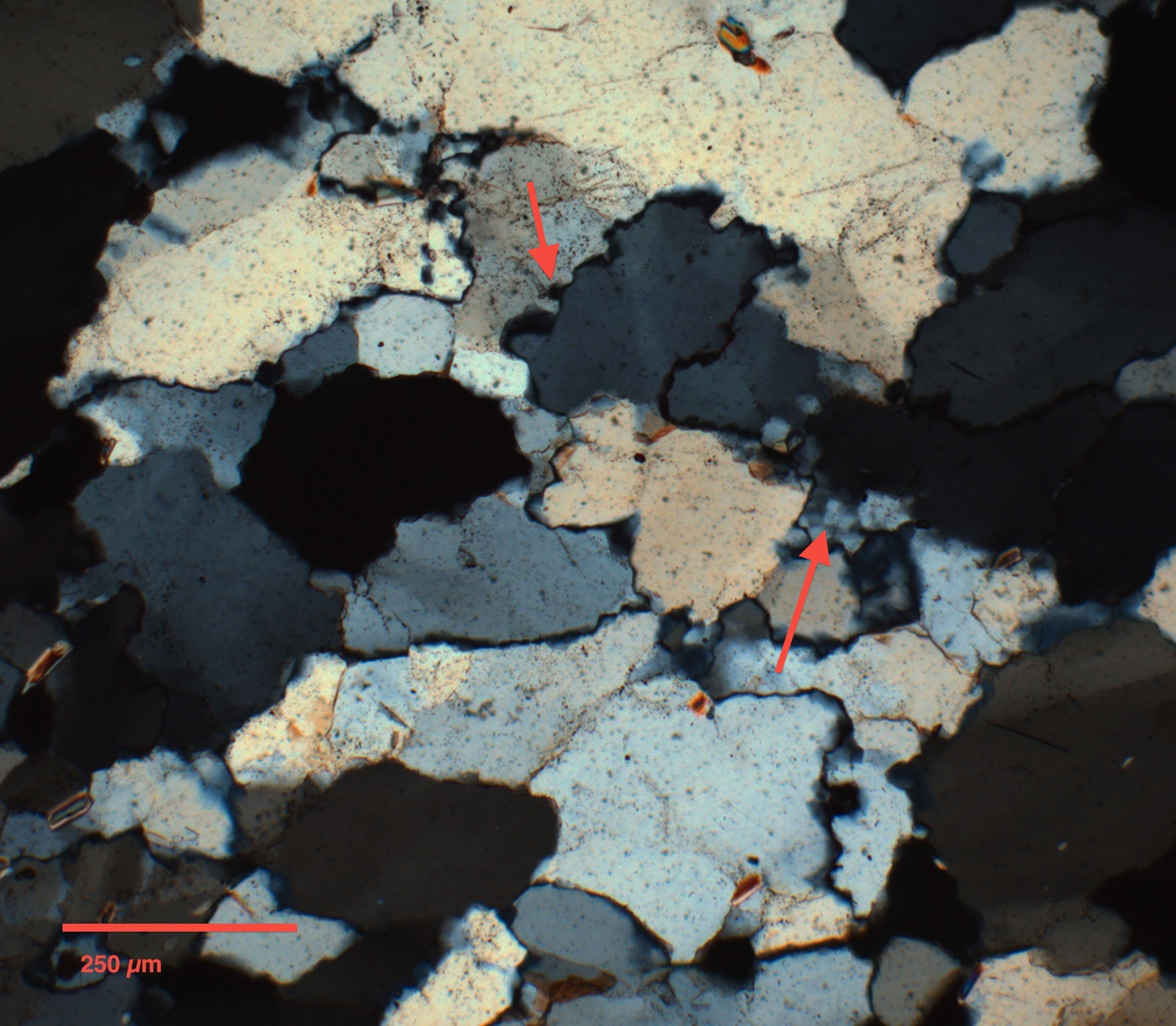
(10x) Quartz exhibiting dominant bulging recrystallization. Note bulges along grain boundaries and recrystallized subgrains along boundaries (marked by arrows). Thin section prepared by Alex Webb.

The lowest temperature texture (~250-400°C), bulging recrystallization (BLG) is characterized by bulges and small recrystallized grains along grain boundaries and, to some extent, microcracks. The at-large proportion and structure of the original quartz crystals is preserved to the greatest extent, compared with the other profiles. Formed by a combination of the two mechanisms mentioned, limited crystal plasticity (due to low temperature) prevents any further separation of subgrains. It follows, then, that an increase in temperature results in an increase in recrystallized grain size and volume proportion (0-25%) as internal stress becomes more resolved.

=== Subgrain rotation recrystallization ===
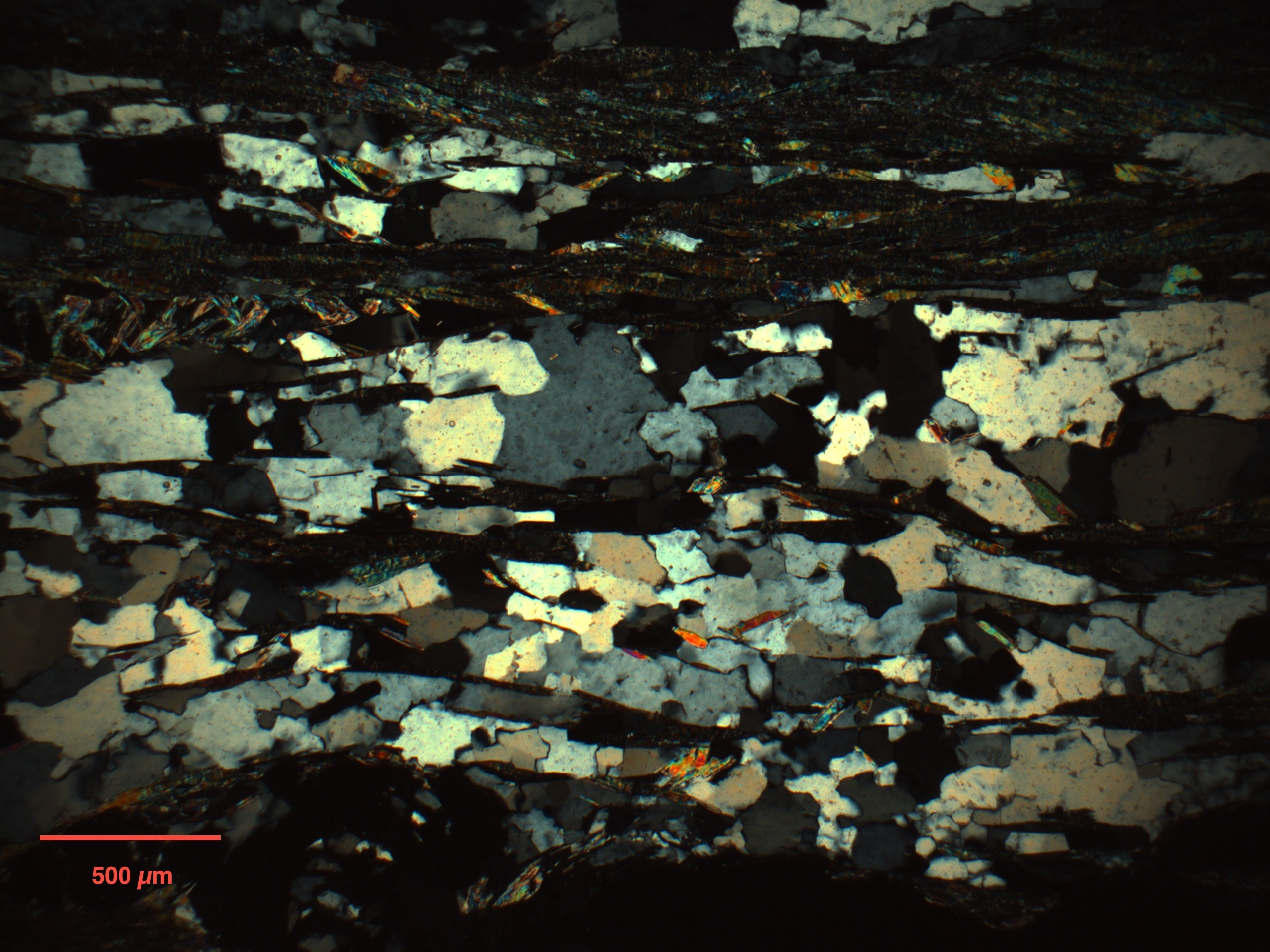
(5x) Quartz(w/mica) exhibiting dominant subgrain rotation recrystallization. Note similar grain/subgrain sizes and relatively straight grain boundaries. Thin section prepared by Alex Webb.

Following an increase in temperature, the dominant texture changes to one marked by the presence of distinct subgrains. Recognizable in thin section by a more polygonized texture, the increased softening of the quartz allows for more thorough reduction of internal stresses. Recrystallized grains show relatively straight grain boundaries and little to no intragranular deformation features, such as undulose extinction or deformation lamellae. Volume proportion of recrystallized grains in this regime roughly ranges from 30-90%, forming subgrains not only in interstitial space, but also within larger crystals or ribbon grains. Subgrains and recrystallized grains are roughly equal in size and shape.

=== Grain boundary migration recrystallization ===
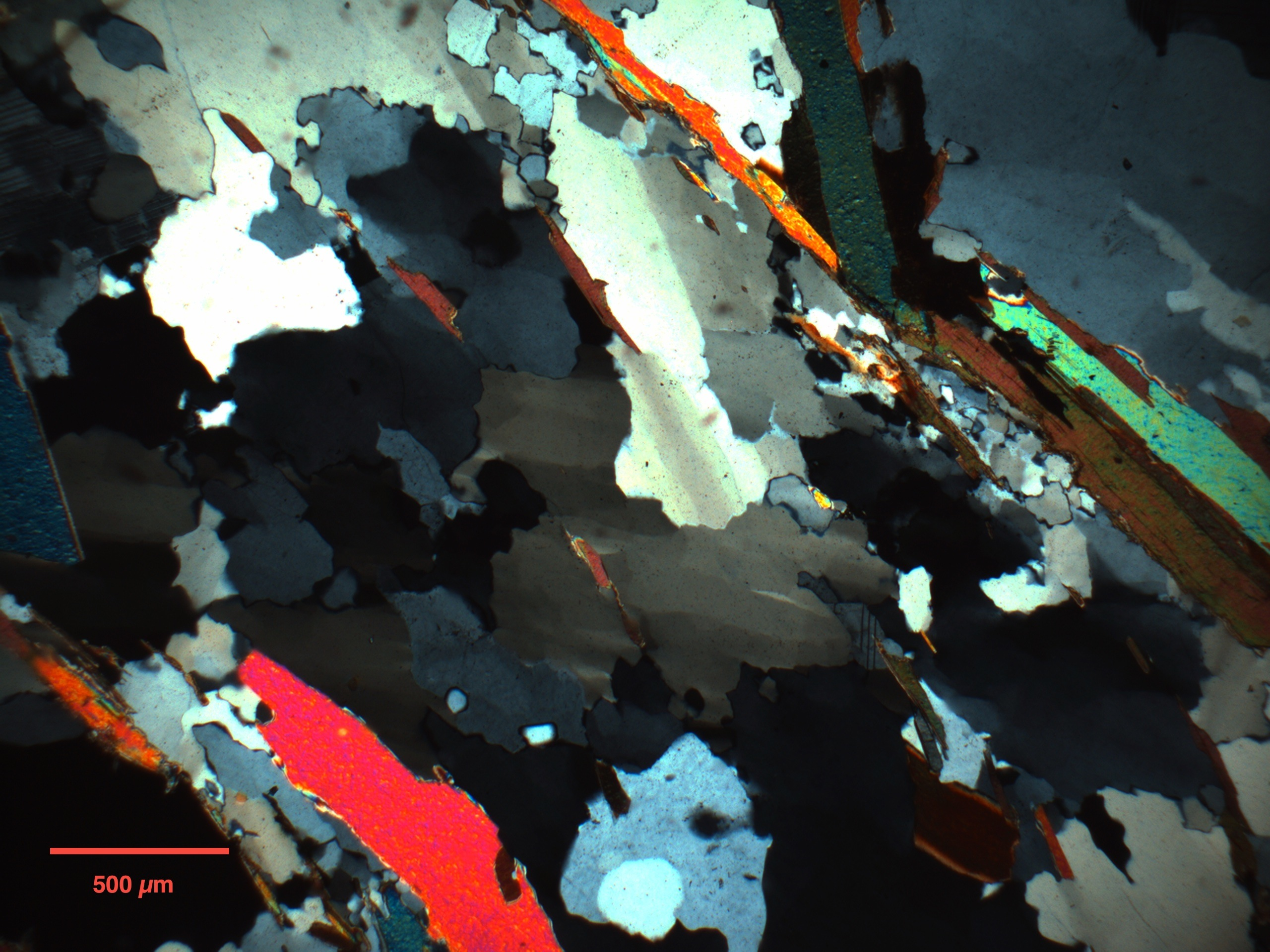
(5x) Photomicrograph of fully recrystallized quartz. Note lobate, interfingering boundaries. Bright colored grains are micas. Thin section prepared by Alex Webb.

The highest temperature of the three textures, grain boundary migration becomes the dominant mechanism at ~500-550°C. Exhibiting much larger recrystallized grain sizes than the other two regimes, in addition to lobate and highly interfingering boundaries, at these temperatures quartz is completely recrystallized. That is, no evidence for original grains can be found. At these high temperatures, grain boundaries are free to sweep across entire grains, resulting in much less localized boundary formation/change. In this case as well, intragranular deformation features have been erased, but may be present from later-stage overprinting.

== Trends ==
Aside from the obvious increase in temperature, there are other trends which arise in this progression of recrystallization.

=== Recrystallized volume proportion ===
As mentioned above, with increased temperature there is a marked increase in the proportion of the rock having undergone recrystallization. From 0-30% in bulging recrystallization, up to 90% in subgrain rotation recrystallization and 100% in grain boundary migration, this property may be observed in quartzite, at least well enough to get relative temperature relationships in the field.

=== Recrystallized grain size ===
Progressing from around 15 μm (bulging recrystallization) to about 85 μm (subgrain rotation recrystallization) to up to a few millimeters (grain boundary migration), this exponential increase is not only noticeable, but is part of the basis on which the three recrystallization regimes were demarcated.

== Utility ==
Observation of recrystallization in a rock sample can reveal a general temperature, but nothing very precise. This is because the process of recrystallization is strongly affected by the presence of water and the amount of strain present. As such, this information can be applied to determine relative temperatures of different rock much more reliably than it can determine absolute temperatures. Furthermore, this is an analysis that can be done, if only preliminarily, in the field by observing rocks in hand sample.

== See also ==
- Subgrain rotation recrystallization
- Neomorphism
- Pressure solution
