= Subgrain rotation recrystallization =

Metallurgical technique

In metallurgy, materials science and structural geology, subgrain rotation recrystallization is recognized as an important mechanism for dynamic recrystallisation. It involves the rotation of initially low-angle sub-grain boundaries until the mismatch between the crystal lattices across the boundary is sufficient for them to be regarded as grain boundaries. This mechanism has been recognized in many minerals (including quartz, calcite, olivine, pyroxenes, micas, feldspars, halite, garnets and zircons) and in metals (various magnesium, aluminium and nickel alloys).

== Structure ==
In metals and minerals, grains are ordered structures in different crystal orientations. Subgrains are defined as grains that are oriented at a < 10–15 degree angle at the grain boundary, making it a low-angle grain boundary (LAGB). Due to the relationship between the energy versus the number of dislocations at the grain boundary, there is a driving force for fewer high-angle grain boundaries (HAGB) to form and grow instead of a higher number of LAGB. The energetics of the transformation depend on the interfacial energy at the boundaries, the lattice geometry (atomic and planar spacing, structure [i.e. FCC/BCC/HCP] of the material, and the degrees of freedom of the grains involved (misorientation, inclination). The recrystallized material has less total grain boundary area, which means that failure via brittle fracture along the grain boundary is less probable.

== Mechanism ==
Subgrain rotation recrystallization is a type of continuous dynamic recrystallization. Continuous dynamic recrystallization involves the evolution of low-angle grains into high-angle grains, increasing their degree of misorientation. One mechanism could be the migration and agglomeration of like-sign dislocations in the LAGB, followed by grain boundary shearing. The transformation occurs when the subgrain boundaries contain small precipitates, which pin them in place. As the subgrain boundaries absorb dislocations, the subgrains transform into grains by rotation, instead of growth. This process generally occurs at elevated temperatures, which allows dislocations to both glide and climb; at low temperatures, dislocation movement is more difficult and the grains are less mobile.

By contrast, discontinuous dynamic recrystallization involves nucleation and growth of new grains, where due to increased temperature and/or pressure, new grains grow at high angles compared to the surrounding grains.

== Mechanical properties ==
Grain strength generally follows the Hall–Petch relation, which states that material strength decreases with the square root of the grain size. A higher number of smaller subgrains leads to a higher yield stress, and so some materials may be purposefully manufactured to have many subgrains, and in this case subgrain rotation recrystallization should be avoided.

Precipitates may also form in grain boundaries. It has been observed that precipitates in subgrain boundaries grow in a more elongated shape parallel to the adjacent grains, whereas precipitates in HAGB are blockier. This difference in aspect ratio may provide different strengthening effects to the material; long plate-like precipitates in the LAGB may delaminate and cause brittle failure under stress. Subgrain rotation recrystallization reduces the number of LAGB, thus reducing the number of flat, long precipitates, and also reducing the number of available pathways for this brittle failure.

== Experimental techniques ==
Different grains and their orientations can be observed using scanning electron microscope (SEM) techniques such as electron backscatter diffraction (EBSD) or polarized optical microscopy (POM). Samples are initially cold- or hot-rolled to introduce a high degree of dislocation density, and then deformed at different strain rates so that dynamic recrystallization occurs. The deformation may be in the form of compression, tension, or torsion. The grains elongate in the direction of applied stress and the misorientation angle of subgrain boundaries increases.
