= Dynamic recrystallization =

Dynamic recrystallization (DRX) is a type of recrystallization process, found within the fields of metallurgy and geology. In dynamic recrystallization, as opposed to static recrystallization, the nucleation and growth of new grains occur during deformation rather than afterwards as part of a separate heat treatment. The reduction of grain size increases the risk of grain boundary sliding at elevated temperatures, while also decreasing dislocation mobility within the material. The new grains are less strained, causing a decrease in the hardening of a material. Dynamic recrystallization allows for new grain sizes and orientation, which can prevent crack propagation. Rather than strain causing the material to fracture, strain can initiate the growth of a new grain, consuming atoms from neighboring pre-existing grains. After dynamic recrystallization, the ductility of the material increases.

In a stress–strain curve, the onset of dynamic recrystallization can be recognized by a distinct peak in the flow stress in hot working data, due to the softening effect of recrystallization. However, not all materials display well-defined peaks when tested under hot working conditions. The onset of DRX can also be detected from inflection point in plots of the strain hardening rate against stress. It has been shown that this technique can be used to establish the occurrence of DRX when this cannot be determined unambiguously from the shape of the flow curve.

If stress oscillations appear before reaching the steady state, then several recrystallization and grain growth cycles occur and the stress behavior is said to be of the cyclic or multiple peak type. The particular stress behavior before reaching the steady state depends on the initial grain size, temperature, and strain rate.

DRX can occur in various forms, including:

- Geometric dynamic recrystallization
- Discontinuous dynamic recrystallization
- Continuous dynamic recrystallization

Dynamic recrystallization is dependent on the rate of dislocation creation and movement. It is also dependent on the recovery rate (the rate at which dislocations annihilate). The interplay between work hardening and dynamic recovery determines grain structure. It also determines the susceptibility of grains to various types of dynamic recrystallization. Regardless of the mechanism, for dynamic recrystallization to occur, the material must have experienced a critical deformation. The final grain size increases with increased stress. To achieve very fine-grained structures the stresses have to be high.

Some authors have used the term 'postdynamic' or 'metadynamic' to describe recrystallization that occurs during the cooling phase of a hot-working process or between successive passes. This emphasises the fact that the recrystallization is directly linked to the process in question, while acknowledging that there is no concurrent deformation.

== Geometric Dynamic Recrystallization (GDRX) ==
Geometric dynamic recrystallization occurs in grains with local serrations. Upon deformation, grains undergoing GDRX elongate until the thickness of the grain falls below a threshold (below which the serration boundaries intersect and small grains pinch off into equiaxed grains). The serrations may predate stresses being exerted on the material, or may result from the material’s deformation.

Geometric Dynamic Recrystallization has 6 main characteristics:

- It generally occurs with deformation at elevated temperatures, in materials with high stacking fault energy
- Stress increases and then declines to a steady state
- Subgrain formation requires a critical deformation
- Subgrain misorientation peaks at 2˚
- There is little texture change
- Pinning of grain boundaries causes an increase in the required strain

While GDRX is primarily affected by the initial grain size and strain (geometry-dependent), other factors that occur during the hot working process complicate the development of predictive modeling (which tend to oversimplify the process) and can lead to incomplete recrystallization. The equiaxed grain formation does not occur immediately and uniformly along the entire grain once the threshold stress is reached, as individual regions are subjected to different strains/stresses. In practice, a generally sinusoidal edge (as predicted by Martorano et al.) gradually forms as the grains begin to pinch off as they each reach the threshold. More sophisticated models consider complex initial grain geometries, local pressures along grain boundaries, and hot working temperature, but the models are unable to make accurate predictions throughout the entire stress regime and the evolution of the overall microstructure. Additionally, grain boundaries may migrate during GDRX at high temperatures and GB curvatures, dragging along subgrain boundaries and resulting in unwanted growth of the original grain. This new, larger grain will require far more deformation for GDRX to occur, and the local area will be weaker rather than strengthened. Lastly, recrystallization can be accelerated as grains are shifted and stretched, causing subgrain boundaries to become grain boundaries (angle increases). The affected grains are thinner and longer, and thus more easily undergo deformation.

== Discontinuous Dynamic Recrystallization ==
Discontinuous recrystallization is heterogeneous; there are distinct nucleation and growth stages. It is common in materials with low stacking-fault energy. Nucleation then occurs, generating new strain-free grains which absorb the pre-existing strained grains. It occurs more easily at grain boundaries, decreasing the grain size and thereby increasing the amount of nucleation sites. This further increases the rate of discontinuous dynamic recrystallization.

Discontinuous Dynamic Recrystallization has 5 main characteristics:

- Recrystallization does not occur until the threshold strain has been reached
- The stress-strain curve may have several peaks – there is not a universal equation
- Nucleation generally occurs along pre-existing grain boundaries
- Recrystallization rates increase as the initial grain size decreases
- There is a steady grain size which is approached as recrystallization proceeds

Discontinuous dynamic recrystallization is caused by the interplay of work hardening and recovery. If the annihilation of dislocations is slow relative to the rate at which they are generated, dislocations accumulate. Once critical dislocation density is achieved, nucleation occurs on grain boundaries. Grain boundary migration, or the atoms transfer from a large pre-existing grain to a smaller nucleus, allows the growth of the new nuclei at the expense of the pre-existing grains. The nucleation can occur through the bulging of existing grain boundaries. A bulge forms if the subgrains abutting a grain boundary are of different sizes, causing a disparity in energy from the two subgrains. If the bulge achieves a critical radius, it will successfully transition to a stable nucleus and continue its growth. This can be modeled using Cahn’s theories pertaining to nucleation and growth.

Discontinuous dynamic recrystallization commonly produces a ‘necklace’ microstructure. Since new grain growth is energetically favorable along grain boundaries, new grain formation and bulging preferentially occurs along pre-existing grain boundaries. This generates layers of new, very fine grains along the grain boundary initially leaving the interior of the pre-existing grain unaffected. As the dynamic recrystallization continues, it consumes the unrecrystallized region. As deformation continues, the recrystallization does not maintain coherency between layers of new nuclei, producing a random texture.

== Continuous Dynamic Recrystallization ==
Continuous dynamic recrystallization is common in materials with high stacking-fault energies. It occurs when low angle grain boundaries form and evolve into high angle boundaries, forming new grains in the process. For continuous dynamic recrystallization there is no clear distinction between nucleation and growth phases of the new grains.

Continuous Dynamic Recrystallization has 4 main characteristics:

- As strain increases, stress increases
- As strain increases, subgrain boundary misorientation increases
- As low angle grain boundaries evolve into high angle grain boundaries, the misorientation increases homogeneously
- As deformation increases, crystallite size decreases

There are three main mechanisms of continuous dynamic recrystallization:

First, continuous dynamic recrystallization can occur when low angle grain boundaries are assembled from dislocations formed within the grain. When the material is subjected to continued stress, the misorientation angle increases until the critical angle is achieved, creating a high angle grain boundary. This evolution can be promoted by the pinning of subgrain boundaries.

Second, continuous dynamic recrystallization can occur through subgrain rotation recrystallization; subgrains rotate increasing the misorientation angle. Once the misorientation angle exceeds the critical angle, the former subgrains qualify as independent grains.

Third, continuous dynamic recrystallization can occur due to deformation caused by microshear bands. Subgrains are assembled by dislocations within the grain formed during work hardening. If microshear bands are formed within the grain, the stress they introduce rapidly increases the misorientation of low angle grain boundaries, transforming them into high angle grain boundaries. However, the impact of microshear bands are localized, so this mechanism preferentially impacts regions which deform heterogeneously, such as microshear bands or areas near pre-existing grain boundaries. As recrystallization proceeds, it spreads out from these zones, generating a homogenous, equiaxed microstructure.

== Mathematical Formulas ==
Based on the method developed by Poliak and Jonas, a few models are developed in order to describe the critical strain for the onset of DRX as a function of the peak strain of the stress–strain curve. The models are derived for the systems with single peak, i.e. for the materials with medium to low stacking fault energy values. The models can be found in the following papers:

- Determination of flow stress and the critical strain for the onset of dynamic recrystallization using a sine function
- Determination of flow stress and the critical strain for the onset of dynamic recrystallization using a hyperbolic tangent function
- Determination of critical strain for initiation of dynamic recrystallization
- Characteristic points of stress–strain curve at high temperature

The DRX behavior for systems with multiple peaks (and single peak as well) can be modeled considering the interaction of multiple grains during deformation. I. e. the ensemble model describes the transition between single and multi peak behavior based on the initial grain size. It can also describe the effect of transient changes of the strain rate on the shape of the flow curve. The model can be found in the following paper:

- A new unified approach for modeling recrystallization during hot rolling of steel

== Literature ==
- A one-parmenter approach to determining the critical conditions for the initiation of dynamic recrystallization, onset of DRX
- Flow Curve Analysis of 17–4 PH Stainless Steel under Hot Compression Test, comprehensive study of DRX
- Constitutive relations to model the hot flow of commercial purity copper, chapter 6, doctoral thesis by V.G. García, UPC (2004)
- A review of dynamic recrystallization phenomena in metallic materials, Latest review paper on DRX
- A Cellular Automaton Model of Dynamic Recrystallization: Introduction & Source Code, Software simulating DRX by CA: Introduction, Video of software run
