= Geometric dynamic recrystallization =

Geometric Dynamic Recrystallization (GDR) is a recrystallization mechanism that has been proposed to occur in several metals and alloys, particularly aluminium, mainly at high temperatures and low strain rates. It is a variant of dynamic recrystallization.

The basic mechanism is that during deformation the grains will be increasingly flattened until the boundaries on each side are separated by only a small distance. The deformation is accompanied by the serration of the grain boundaries due to surface tension effects where they are in contact with low-angle grain boundaries belonging to sub-grains.

Eventually the points of the serrations will come into contact. Since the contacting boundaries are defects of opposite 'sign' they are able to annihilate and so reduce the total energy in the system. In effect the grain will pinch in two new grains.

The grain size is known to decrease as the applied stress is increased. However, high stresses require a high strain rate and at some point statically recrystallized grains will begin to nucleate and consume the GDRX microstructure.

There are features that are unique to GDRX:

- The recrystallisation spreads throughout the specimen over a strain range (0.5-1 in Al-Mg-Mn alloys) without any change in flow stress. This is in contrast to discontinuous mechanisms where the flow stress normally decreases by ~25% as the recrystallized grains form.
- GDRX results in grains that are around 3 times the sub-grain size. Statically recrystallized grains are normally 20-30 times the sub-grain size.
