= Paleostress =

Paleostress is a term used in geology (specifically in the fields of structural geology and tectonics) to indicate mechanical stress that has affected rock formations in the geological past.

In practice, a paleostress tensor may be quantified based on the measurement of certain geological structures (e.g. faults), whose specific geometries and spatial organization are theoretically linked to the parameters of the tensor (see paleostress inversion). The latter are quantified through inversion of the structures measured in the field (or potentially on rock samples in the lab).

Paleostress is a subset of mechanical stress within geology. Variations in stress fields within the Earth's crust can result in a variety of mechanical responses:

- Microscopic:

- Crystal deformation, including twinning,
- Pressure solution
- Microfractures,
- Aligned fluid inclusions.

- Macroscopic:

- Folding
- Fracturing
- Faulting (fracturing accompanied by offset of rock bodies on either side of the fracture surface)

Traditionally, deformations (either folding or fracturing—without dissolution) are collectively termed mechanical strain. Both macroscopic and microscopic strain may be elastic, and only exist as long as differential stress exists, or it may be inelastic -- that is the deformation due to a particular stress event remains even after the stress is removed. In the latter case, inelastic deformation, the stress field responsible for the deformation if it can be inferred, is, then, the paleostress. Anderson's classic analysis of faulting serves as a simple application of paleostress analysis in terms of principal components of stress.

Zoback and Zoback's (1986) synthesis of contemporary stress measurements in North America was subsequently expanded to a global study which continues as the World Stress Project.

A number of regional studies of paleostresses has been undertaken, including Europe; North America; and Australia.
