= Grain boundary =

Interface between crystallites in a polycrystalline material

External video
- Experiments with the Bubble Model of Metal Structure 1952 - Sir Lawrence Bragg, W.M Lomer, J.F. Nye, from Science films from the archives of the Royal Institution, retrieved 09.08.2026

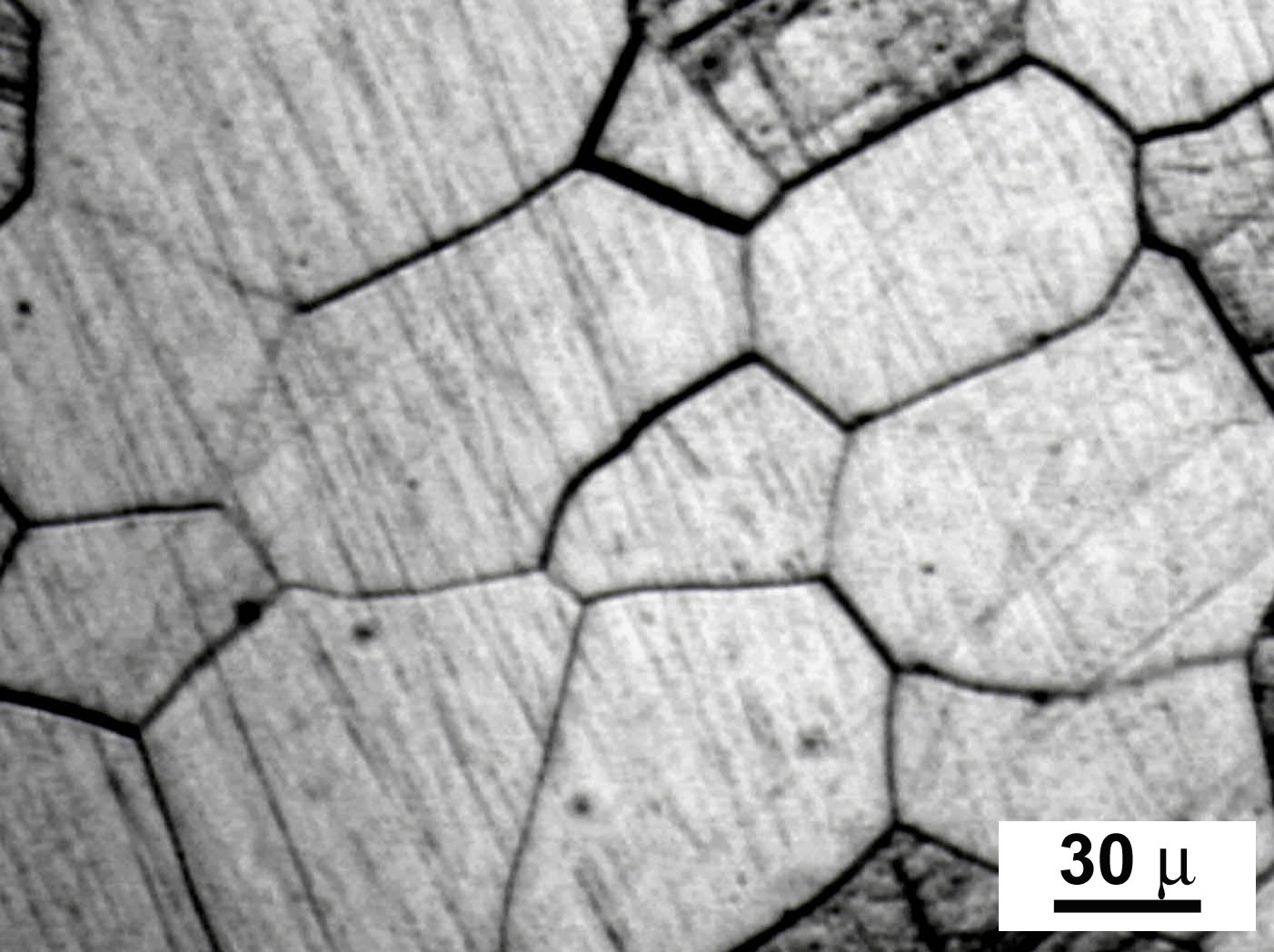
Micrograph of a polycrystalline metal; grain boundaries evidenced by acid etching

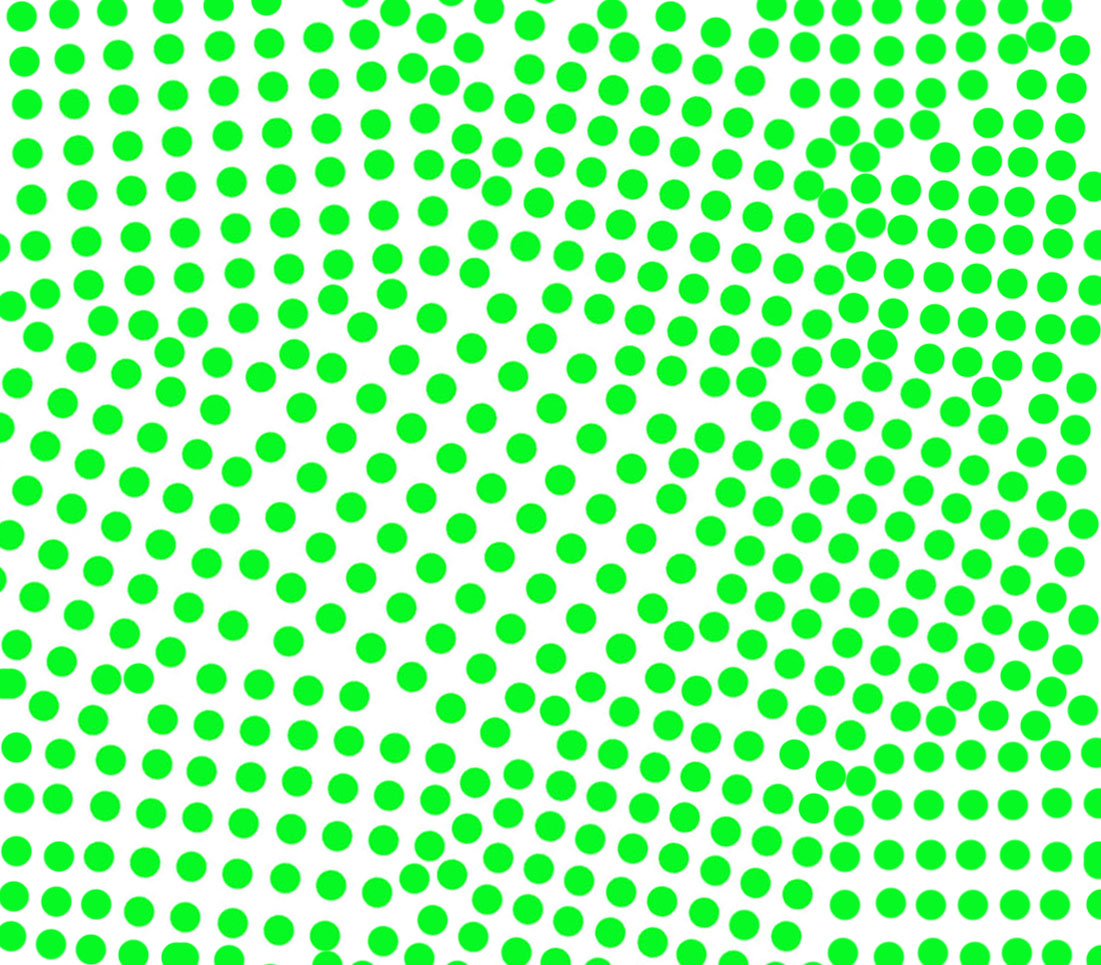
Differently-oriented crystallites in a polycrystalline material

In materials science, a grain boundary is the interface between two differently oriented grains, or crystallites, of the same phase in a polycrystalline material. Grain boundaries are two-dimensional defects in the crystal structure, and tend to decrease the electrical and thermal conductivity of the material. Most grain boundaries are preferred sites for the onset of corrosion and for the precipitation of new phases from the solid. They are also important to many of the mechanisms of creep. On the other hand, grain boundaries disrupt the motion of dislocations through a material, so reducing crystallite size is a common way to improve mechanical strength, as described by the Hall–Petch relationship.

== High and low angle boundaries ==
It is convenient to categorize grain boundaries according to the extent of misorientation between the two grains. Low-angle grain boundaries (LAGB) or subgrain boundaries are those with a misorientation less than about 15 degrees. Generally speaking they are composed of an array of dislocations and their properties and structure are a function of the misorientation. In contrast the properties of high-angle grain boundaries, whose misorientation is greater than about 15 degrees (the transition angle varies from 10 to 15 degrees depending on the material), are normally found to be independent of the misorientation. However, there are 'special boundaries' at particular orientations whose interfacial energies are markedly lower than those of general high-angle grain boundaries.

Schematic representations of a tilt boundary (top) and a twist boundary between two idealised grains

The simplest boundary is that of a tilt boundary where the rotation axis is parallel to the boundary plane. This boundary can be conceived as forming from a single, contiguous crystallite or grain which is gradually bent by some external force. The energy associated with the elastic bending of the lattice can be reduced by inserting a dislocation, which is essentially a half-plane of atoms that act like a wedge, that creates a permanent misorientation between the two sides. As the grain is bent further, more and more dislocations must be introduced to accommodate the deformation resulting in a growing wall of dislocations – a low-angle boundary. The grain can now be considered to have split into two sub-grains of related crystallography but notably different orientations.

An alternative is a twist boundary where the misorientation occurs around an axis that is perpendicular to the boundary plane. This type of boundary incorporates two sets of screw dislocations. If the Burgers vectors of the dislocations are orthogonal, then the dislocations do not strongly interact and form a square network. In other cases, the dislocations may interact to form a more complex hexagonal structure.

These concepts of tilt and twist boundaries represent somewhat idealized cases. The majority of boundaries are of a mixed type, containing dislocations of different types and Burgers vectors, in order to create the best fit between the neighboring grains.

If the dislocations in the boundary remain isolated and distinct, the boundary can be considered to be low-angle. If deformation continues, the density of dislocations will increase and so reduce the spacing between neighboring dislocations. Eventually, the cores of the dislocations will begin to overlap and the ordered nature of the boundary will begin to break down. At this point the boundary can be considered to be high-angle and the original grain to have separated into two entirely separate grains.

In comparison to low-angle grain boundaries, high-angle boundaries are considerably more disordered, with large areas of poor fit and a comparatively open structure. Indeed, they were originally thought to be some form of amorphous or even liquid layer between the grains. However, this model could not explain the observed strength of grain boundaries and, after the invention of electron microscopy, direct evidence of the grain structure meant the hypothesis had to be discarded. It is now accepted that a boundary consists of structural units which depend on both the misorientation of the two grains and the plane of the interface. The types of structural unit that exist can be related to the concept of the coincidence site lattice, in which repeated units are formed from points where the two misoriented \ In coincident site lattice (CSL) theory, the degree of fit (Σ) between the structures of the two grains is described by the reciprocal of the ratio of coincidence sites to the total number of sites.

In this framework, it is possible to draw the lattice for the two grains and count the number of atoms that are shared (coincidence sites), and the total number of atoms on the boundary (total number of site). For example, when Σ=3 there will be one atom of each three that will be shared between the two lattices. Thus a boundary with high Σ might be expected to have a higher energy than one with low Σ. Low-angle boundaries, where the distortion is entirely accommodated by dislocations, are Σ1. Some other low-Σ boundaries have special properties, especially when the boundary plane is one that contains a high density of coincident sites. Examples include coherent twin boundaries (e.g., Σ3) and high-mobility boundaries in FCC materials (e.g., Σ7). Deviations from the ideal CSL orientation may be accommodated by local atomic relaxation or the inclusion of dislocations at the boundary.

== Describing a boundary ==
A boundary can be described by the orientation of the boundary to the two grains and the 3-D rotation required to bring the grains into coincidence. Thus a boundary has 5 macroscopic degrees of freedom. However, it is common to describe a boundary only as the orientation relationship of the neighbouring grains. Generally, the convenience of ignoring the boundary plane orientation, which is very difficult to determine, outweighs the reduced information. The relative orientation of the two grains is described using the rotation matrix:

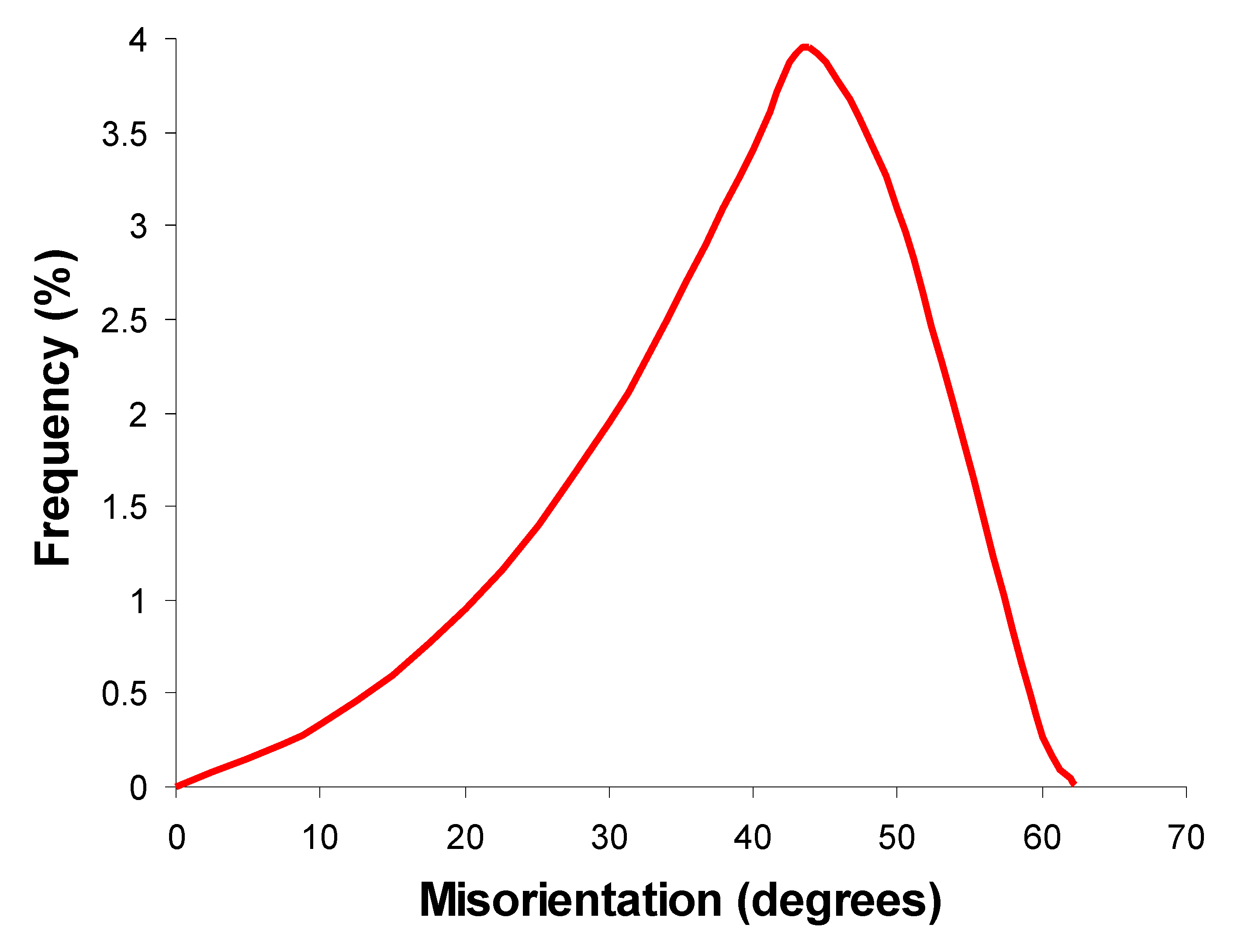
The characteristic distribution of boundary misorientations in a completely randomly oriented set of grains for cubic symmetry materials

$$R = \begin{bmatrix} a_{11} & a_{12} & a_{13}
\\ a_{21} & a_{22} & a_{23}
\\ a_{31} & a_{32} & a_{33} \end{bmatrix}$$

Using this system the rotation angle θ is:

$$2\cos\;\theta\;+1 = a_{11} + a_{22} + a_{33} \,\!$$

while the direction [uvw] of the rotation axis is:

$$[(a_{32}-a_{23}),(a_{13}-a_{31}),(a_{21}-a_{12})] \,\!$$

The nature of the crystallography involved limits the misorientation of the boundary. A completely random polycrystal, with no texture, thus has a characteristic distribution of boundary misorientations (see figure). However, such cases are rare and most materials will deviate from this ideal to a greater or lesser degree.

== Boundary energy ==
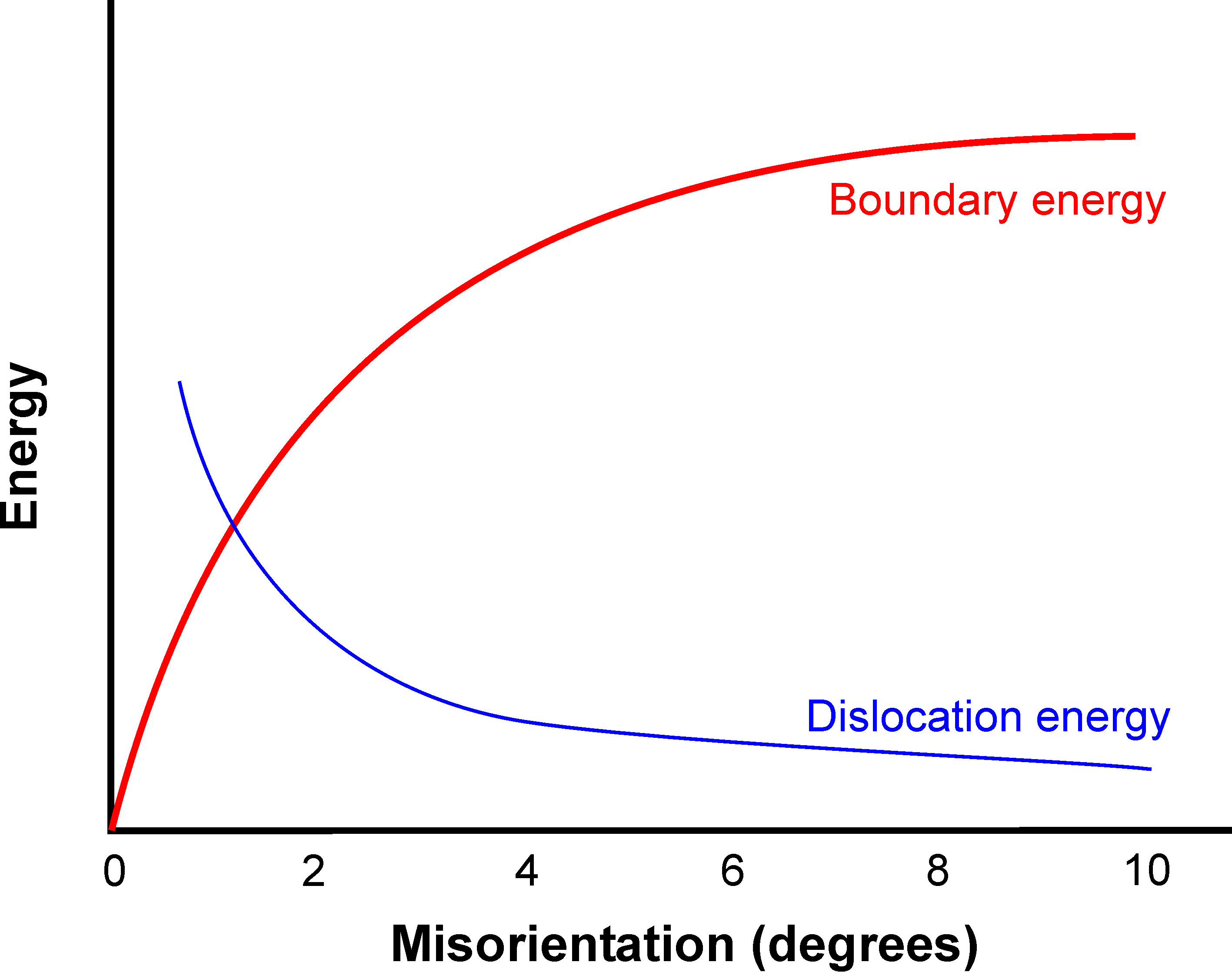
The energy of a tilt boundary and the energy per dislocation as the misorientation of the boundary increases

The energy of a low-angle boundary is dependent on the degree of misorientation between the neighbouring grains up to the transition to high-angle status. In the case of simple tilt boundaries the energy of a boundary made up of dislocations with Burgers vector b and spacing h is predicted by the Read–Shockley equation:

$$\gamma _s = \gamma _0 \theta (A - \ln \theta) \,\!$$

where:

$$\theta = b / h \,\!$$

$$\gamma_0 = Gb/4\pi(1-\nu) \,\!$$

$$A = 1 + \ln(b/2\pi r_0) \,\!$$

with $G$ is the shear modulus, $\nu$ is Poisson's ratio, and $r_0$ is the radius of the dislocation core. It can be seen that as the energy of the boundary increases the energy per dislocation decreases. Thus there is a driving force to produce fewer, more misoriented boundaries (i.e., grain growth).

The situation in high-angle boundaries is more complex. Although theory predicts that the energy will be a minimum for ideal CSL configurations, with deviations requiring dislocations and other energetic features, empirical measurements suggest the relationship is more complicated. Some predicted troughs in energy are found as expected while others missing or substantially reduced. Surveys of the available experimental data have indicated that simple relationships such as low $\Sigma$ are misleading:

It is concluded that no general and useful criterion for low energy can be enshrined in a simple geometric framework. Any understanding of the variations of interfacial energy must take account of the atomic structure and the details of the bonding at the interface.

== Excess volume ==
The excess volume is another important property in the characterization of grain boundaries. Excess volume was first proposed by Bishop in a private communication to Aaron and Bolling in 1972. It describes how much expansion is induced by the presence of a GB and is thought that the degree and susceptibility of segregation is directly proportional to this. Despite the name the excess volume is actually a change in length, this is because of the 2D nature of GBs the length of interest is the expansion normal to the GB plane. The excess volume ($\delta V$) is defined in the following way,

$$\delta V = \left ( \frac{\partial V} {\partial A} \right)_{T,p,n_i},$$

at constant temperature $T$, pressure $p$ and number of atoms $n_i$. Although a rough linear relationship between GB energy and excess volume exists the orientations where this relationship is violated can behave significantly differently affecting mechanical and electrical properties.

Experimental techniques have been developed which directly probe the excess volume and have been used to explore the properties of nanocrystalline copper and nickel. Theoretical methods have also been developed and are in good agreement. A key observation is that there is an inverse relationship with the bulk modulus meaning that the larger the bulk modulus (the ability to compress a material) the smaller the excess volume will be, there is also direct relationship with the lattice constant, this provides methodology to find materials with a desirable excess volume for a specific application.

== Boundary migration ==
The movement of grain boundaries (HAGB) has implications for recrystallization and grain growth while subgrain boundary (LAGB) movement strongly influences recovery and the nucleation of recrystallization.

A boundary moves due to a pressure acting on it. It is generally assumed that the velocity is directly proportional to the pressure with the constant of proportionality being the mobility of the boundary. The mobility is strongly temperature dependent and often follows an Arrhenius type relationship:

$$M = M_0 \exp \left (- \frac{Q}{RT} \right ) \,\!$$

The apparent activation energy (Q) may be related to the thermally activated atomistic processes that occur during boundary movement. However, there are several proposed mechanisms where the mobility will depend on the driving pressure and the assumed proportionality may break down.

It is generally accepted that the mobility of low-angle boundaries is much lower than that of high-angle boundaries. The following observations appear to hold true over a range of conditions:

- The mobility of low-angle boundaries is proportional to the pressure acting on it.
- The rate controlling process is that of bulk diffusion
- The boundary mobility increases with misorientation.

Since low-angle boundaries are composed of arrays of dislocations and their movement may be related to dislocation theory. The most likely mechanism, given the experimental data, is that of dislocation climb, rate limited by the diffusion of solute in the bulk.

The movement of high-angle boundaries occurs by the transfer of atoms between the neighbouring grains. The ease with which this can occur will depend on the structure of the boundary, itself dependent on the crystallography of the grains involved, impurity atoms and the temperature. It is possible that some form of diffusionless mechanism (akin to diffusionless phase transformations such as martensite) may operate in certain conditions. Some defects in the boundary, such as steps and ledges, may also offer alternative mechanisms for atomic transfer.

Grain growth can be inhibited by second phase particles via Zener pinning.

Since a high-angle boundary is imperfectly packed compared to the normal lattice it has some amount of free space or free volume where solute atoms may possess a lower energy. As a result, a boundary may be associated with a solute atmosphere that will retard its movement. Only at higher velocities will the boundary be able to break free of its atmosphere and resume normal motion.

Both low- and high-angle boundaries are retarded by the presence of particles via the so-called Zener pinning effect. This effect is often exploited in commercial alloys to minimise or prevent recrystallization or grain growth during heat-treatment.

== Complexion ==
Grain boundaries are the preferential site for segregation of impurities, which may form a thin layer with a different composition from the bulk and a variety of atomic structures that are distinct from the abutting crystalline phases. For example, a thin layer of silica, which also contains impurity cations, is often present in silicon nitride.

Grain boundary complexions were introduced by Ming Tang, Rowland Cannon, and W. Craig Carter in 2006.

These grain boundary phases are thermodynamically stable and can be considered as quasi-two-dimensional phase, which may undergo to transition, similar to those of bulk phases. In this case structure and chemistry abrupt changes are possible at a critical value of a thermodynamic parameter like temperature or pressure. This may strongly affect the macroscopic properties of the material, for example the electrical resistance or creep rates. Grain boundaries can be analyzed using equilibrium thermodynamics but cannot be considered as phases, because they do not satisfy Gibbs' definition: they are inhomogeneous, may have a gradient of structure, composition or properties. For this reasons they are defined as complexion: an interfacial material or stata that is in thermodynamic equilibrium with its abutting phases, with a finite and stable thickness (that is typically 2–20 Å). A complexion need the abutting phase to exist and its composition and structure need to be different from the abutting phase. Contrary to bulk phases, complexions also depend on the abutting phase. For example, silica rich amorphous layer present in Si_{3}N_{3}, is about 10 Å thick, but for special boundaries this equilibrium thickness is zero. Complexion can be grouped in 6 categories, according to their thickness: monolayer, bilayer, trilayer, nanolayer (with equilibrium thickness between 1 and 2 nm) and wetting. In the first cases the thickness of the layer will be constant; if extra material is present it will segregate at multiple grain junction, while in the last case there is no equilibrium thickness and this is determined by the amount of secondary phase present in the material. One example of grain boundary complexion transition is the passage from dry boundary to biltilayer in Au-doped Si, which is produced by the increase of Au.

== Effect to the electronic structure ==
Grain boundaries can cause failure mechanically by embrittlement through solute segregation (see Hinkley Point A nuclear power station) but they also can detrimentally affect the electronic properties. In metal oxides it has been shown theoretically that at the grain boundaries in Al_{2}O_{3} and MgO the insulating properties can be significantly diminished. Using density functional theory computer simulations of grain boundaries have shown that the band gap can be reduced by up to 45%. In the case of metals grain boundaries increase the resistivity as the size of the grains relative to the mean free path of other scatters becomes significant.

== Defect concentration near grain boundaries ==
It is known that most materials are polycrystalline and contain grain boundaries and that grain boundaries can act as sinks and transport pathways for point defects. However experimentally and theoretically determining what effect point defects have on a system is difficult. Interesting examples of the complications of how point defects behave has been manifested in the temperature dependence of the Seebeck effect. In addition the dielectric and piezoelectric response can be altered by the distribution of point defects near grain boundaries. Mechanical properties can also be significantly influenced with properties such as the bulk modulus and damping being influenced by changes to the distribution of point defects within a material. It has also been found that the Kondo effect within graphene can be tuned due to a complex relationship between grain boundaries and point defects. Recent theoretical calculations have revealed that point defects can be extremely favourable near certain grain boundary types and significantly affect the electronic properties with a reduction in the band gap.

== Relationship between theory and experiment ==
There has been a significant amount of work experimentally to observe both the structure and measure the properties of grain boundaries but the five dimensional degrees of freedom of grain boundaries within complex polycrystalline networks has not yet been fully understood and thus there is currently no method to control the structure and properties of most metals and alloys with atomic precision. Part of the problem is related to the fact that much of the theoretical work to understand grain boundaries is based upon construction of bicrystal (two) grains which do not represent the network of grains typically found in a real system and the use of classical force fields such as the embedded atom method often do not describe the physics near the grains correctly and density functional theory could be required to give realistic insights. Accurate modelling of grain boundaries both in terms of structure and atomic interactions could have the effect of improving engineering which could reduce waste and increase efficiency in terms of material usage and performance. From a computational point of view much of the research on grain boundaries has focused on bi-crystal systems, these are systems which only consider two grain boundaries. There has been recent work which has made use of novel grain evolution models which show that there are substantial differences in the material properties associated with whether curved or planar grains are present.

== See also ==
- Abnormal grain growth
- Segregation in materials
