= Flow stress =

Instantaneous value of stress required to continue plastically deforming a material

In materials science, the flow stress, typically denoted as $Y_\text{f}$ (or $\sigma_\text{f}$), is defined as the instantaneous value of stress required to continue plastically deforming a material - to keep it flowing. It is most commonly, though not exclusively, used in reference to metals. On a stress-strain curve, the flow stress can be found anywhere within the plastic regime; more explicitly, a flow stress can be found for any value of strain between and including yield point ($\sigma_\text{y}$) and excluding fracture ($\sigma_\text{F}$): $\sigma_\text{y} \leq Y_\text{f} < \sigma_\text{F}$.

The flow stress changes as deformation proceeds and usually increases as strain accumulates due to work hardening, although the flow stress could decrease due to any recovery process. In continuum mechanics, the flow stress for a given material will vary with changes in temperature, $T$, strain, $\varepsilon$, and strain-rate, $\dot{\varepsilon}$; therefore it can be written as some function of those properties:

$$Y_\text{f}=f(\varepsilon,\dot{\varepsilon},T)$$

The exact equation to represent flow stress depends on the particular material and plasticity model being used. Hollomon's equation is commonly used to represent the behavior seen in a stress-strain plot during work hardening:

$$Y_\text{f} = K\varepsilon_\text{p}^\text{n}$$

Where $Y_\text{f}$ is flow stress, $K$ is a strength coefficient, $\varepsilon_\text{p}$ is the plastic strain, and $n$ is the strain hardening exponent. Note that this is an empirical relation and does not model the relation at other temperatures or strain-rates (though the behavior may be similar).

Generally, raising the temperature of an alloy above 0.5 T_{m} results in the plastic deformation mechanisms being controlled by strain-rate sensitivity, whereas at room temperature metals are generally strain-dependent. Other models may also include the effects of strain gradients. Independent of test conditions, the flow stress is also affected by: chemical composition, purity, crystal structure, phase constitution, microstructure, grain size, and prior strain.

The flow stress is an important parameter in the fatigue failure of ductile materials. Fatigue failure is caused by crack propagation in materials under a varying load, typically a cyclically varying load. A higher flow stress generally means the material is more resistant to fatigue initiation and propagation, especially in low-cycle fatigue conditions where plastic deformation is prominent.
