= Liquid rope coil effect =

Fluid mechanics phenomenon

The liquid rope coil effect or liquid rope coiling is a fluid mechanics phenomenon characterized by the steadily rotating helical structure formed when pouring a thin stream of viscous fluid from a sufficient height onto a surface, resulting from a buckling instability in which the initially vertical fluid stream becomes unstable to bending deformation under axial compressive stress.

The rope can change shape in three ways: stretching, bending, and twisting. Each deformation faces resistance in the form of viscous forces. The rope's shape is influenced by the balance between these forces and the fluid's inertia. Surface tension, usually significant in fluid dynamics, plays only a minor role.
