= Dynamic strain aging =

Dynamic strain aging (DSA) for materials science is an instability in plastic flow of materials, associated with interaction between moving dislocations and diffusing solutes. Although sometimes dynamic strain aging is used interchangeably with the Portevin–Le Chatelier effect (or serrated yielding), dynamic strain aging refers specifically to the microscopic mechanism that induces the Portevin–Le Chatelier effect. This strengthening mechanism is related to solid-solution strengthening and has been observed in a variety of fcc and bcc substitutional and interstitial alloys, metalloids like silicon, and ordered intermetallics within specific ranges of temperature and strain rate.

== Description of mechanism ==
In materials, the motion of dislocations is a discontinuous process. When dislocations meet obstacles during plastic deformation (such as particles or forest dislocations), they are temporarily arrested for a certain time. During this time, solutes (such as interstitial particles or substitutional impurities) diffuse around the pinned dislocations, further strengthening the obstacles' hold on the dislocations. Eventually these dislocations will overcome the obstacles with sufficient stress and will quickly move to the next obstacle where they are stopped and the process can repeat. This process's most well-known macroscopic manifestations are Lüders bands and the Portevin–Le Chatelier effect. However, the mechanism is known to affect materials without these physical observations.

=== Model for substitutional solute DSA ===
In metal alloys with substitutional solute elements, such as aluminum-magnesium alloys, dynamic strain aging leads to negative strain rate sensitivity which causes instability in plastic flow. The diffusion of solute elements around a dislocation can be modeled based on the energy required to move a solute atom across the slip plane of the dislocation. An edge dislocation produces a stress field which is compressive above the slip plane and tensile below. In Al-Mg alloys, the Mg atom is larger than an Al atom and has lower energy on the tension side of the dislocation slip plane; therefore, Mg atoms in the vicinity of an edge dislocation are driven to diffuse across the slip plane (see figure). The resulting region of lower solute concentration above the slip plane weakens the material in the region near the pinned dislocation, such that when the dislocation becomes mobile again, the stress required to move it is temporarily reduced. This effect can manifest as serrations in the stress-strain curve (Portevin-Le Chatelier effect).

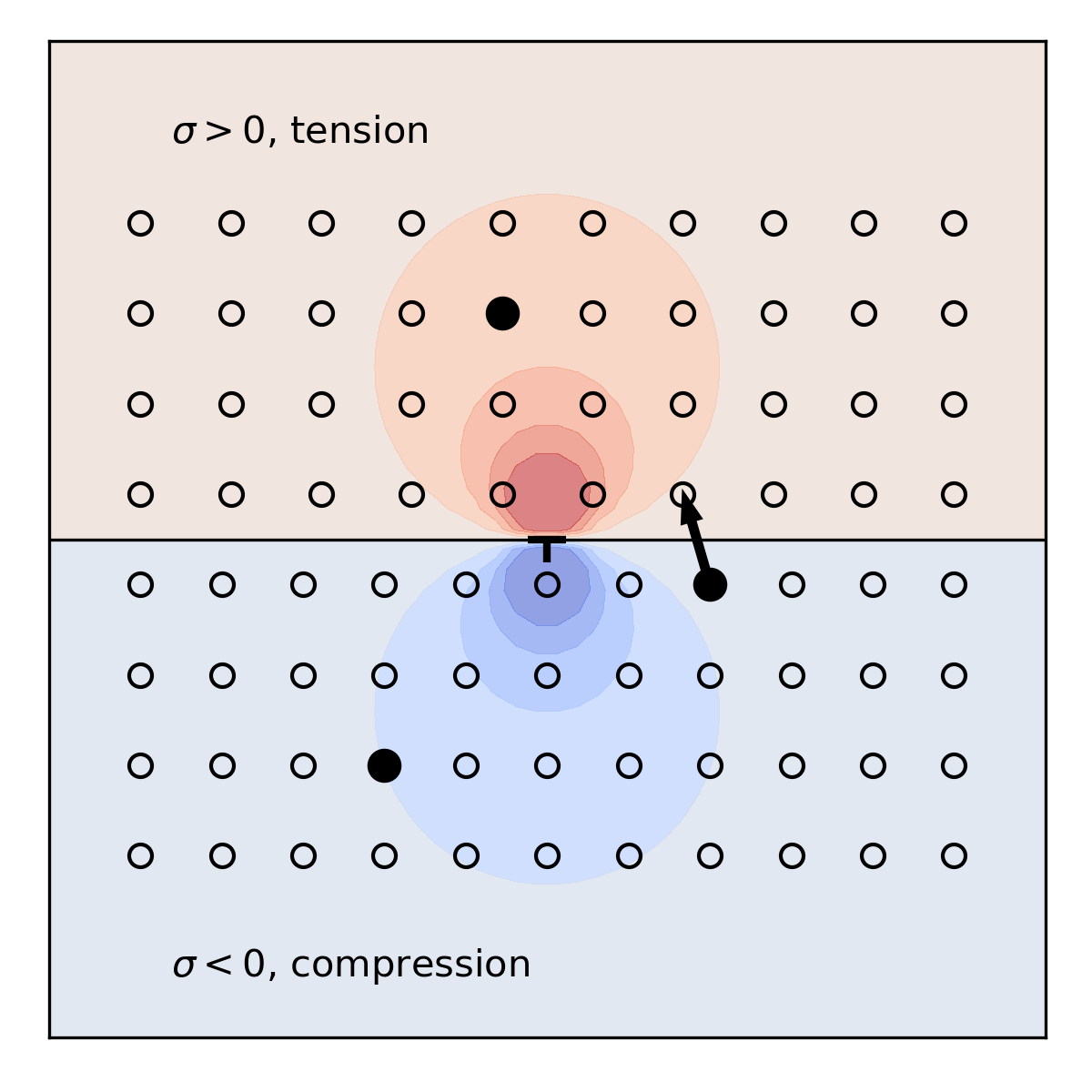
Stress field around an edge dislocation core, with schematic atomic positions overlaid. The filled circles represent larger substitutional impurities, which are driven across the slip plane during dynamic strain aging (shown by the arrow).

Because solute diffusion is thermally activated, increases in temperature can increase the rate and range of diffusion around a dislocation core. This can result in more severe stress drops, typically marked by a transition from Type A to Type C serrations.

== Material property effects ==
Although serrations in the stress–strain curve caused by the Portevin–Le Chatelier effect are the most visible effect of dynamic strain aging, other effects may be present when this effect is not seen. Often when serrated flow is not seen, dynamic strain aging is marked by a lower strain rate sensitivity. That becomes negative in the Portevin–Le Chatelier regime. Dynamic strain aging also causes a plateau in the strength, a peak in flow stress a peak in work hardening, a peak in the Hall–Petch constant, and minimum variation of ductility with temperature. Since dynamic strain aging is a hardening phenomenon it increases the strength of the material.

== Effect of alloying elements on DSA ==
Two categories can be distinguished by the interaction pathway. The first class of Elements, such as carbon(C) and nitrogen(N), contribute to DSA directly by diffusing quickly enough through the lattice to the dislocations and locking them. Such effect is determined with the element’s solubility, diffusion coefficient, and the interaction energy between the elements and dislocations, i.e. the severity of dislocation locking.

== Types of DSA Serrations ==
At least five classes can be identified according to the stress-strain relation appearance of Serration.

=== Type A ===
Arising from the repeated nucleation of shear bands and the continuous propagation of Lüders bands, this type consists of periodic locking serrations with abrupt increase in flow stress followed by drop of stress below the general level of the stress-strain curve. It is usually seen in the low temperature (high strain rate) part of the DS regime.

=== Type B ===
Result from the nucleation of narrow shear bands, which propagate discontinuously or do not propagate due to the adjacent nucleation sites, and thus oscillate about the general level of the flow curve. It occurs at higher temperature or lower strain rates than type A. It may also be developed from type A when it comes to higher strain.

=== Type C ===
Caused by dislocation unlocking, the stress drop of type C is below the general level of the flow curve. It occurs at even higher temperature and lower strain comparation to A and B type.

=== Type D ===
When there is no work hardening, a plateau on the stress-strain curve is seen and therefore is also named staircase type. This type forms a mixed mode with type B.

=== Type E ===
Occurring at higher strain after type A, type E is not easy to be recognized.

== Material specific example of dynamic strain aging ==
Dynamic strain aging has been shown to be linked to these specific material problems:

- Decrease the fracture resistance of Al–Li alloys.
- Decrease low cycle fatigue life of austenitic stainless steels and super-alloys under test conditions which are similar to the service conditions in liquid-metal-cooled fast breeder reactors in which the material is used.
- Reduce fracture toughness by 30–40% and shorten the air fatigue life of RPC steels and may worsen the cracking resistance of steels in aggressive environments. The susceptibility of RPC steels to environment assisted creating in high temperature water coincides with DSA behavior
- PLC specific problems like blue brittleness in steel, loss of ductility and bad surface finishes for formed Aluminum Magnesium alloys.

== See also ==
- Portevin–Le Chatelier effect
- Lüders band
