= Plane strain compression test =

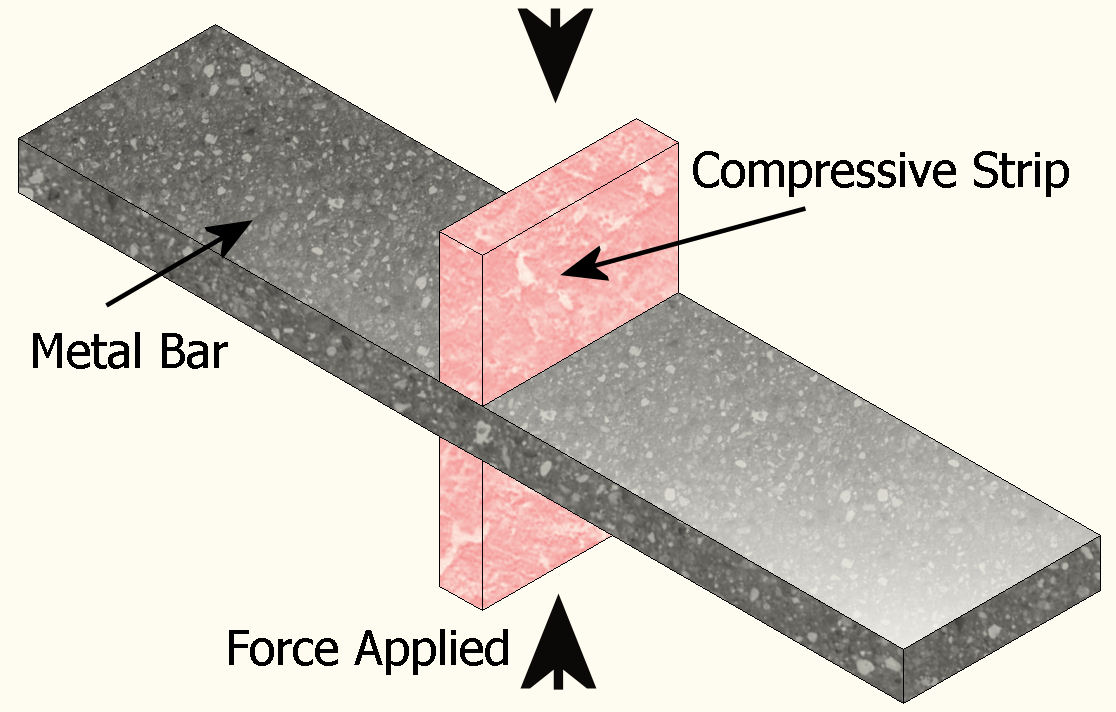
A schematic of the plane strain compression test on a metal bar

The plane strain compression test is a specialized test used on some materials, ranging from metals to soils.

== Metals ==
One variation of the test is also known as the Watts-Ford test. It is an engineering test, and is a particularly specialized way of determining some of the material characteristics of the metal being tested, and its specialization can be summarized by this quote:

The test is useful when the sheet pieces are too small for a tensile test of a balanced biaxial test. It can give stress-strain curves up to considerably higher strains than tensile tests.

Plane-strain compression testing is typically used for measuring mechanical properties and for exploring microstructure development in the course of thermomechanical treatment. During the test the specimen is placed between the punches and the constrain plates. When the upper punch is pushed down during the material test, the specimen is extended to horizontal directions. Friction between the tool and the specimen can be reduced by applying lubricants, such as graphite, MoS2, glass or PTFE(Teflon).

The testing essentially consists of a thin metal bar being compressed by two equally wide compressive strips, which are located of opposite sides of the thin bar. Then, over a range of increasing loads on the bar, the compressive forces lead to the thickness of the metal bar being reduced. This change of thickness is then measured sequentially after each loading, and after some mathematics a stress-strain curve can be plotted.

The advantages of the Watts-Ford test are that it is convenient for testing thin sheets or strips, it is similar to a rolling process (in manufacturing analyses), frictional effects may be minimized, there is no 'barrelling' as would occur in a cylindrical compression test, and the plane strain deformation eases the analysis.

Stress-strain curve

The stress-strain curve is the relationship between the stress (force per unit area) and strain (resulting compression/stretching, known as deformation) that a particular material displays; stress–strain curves of various materials differ widely, and different tensile tests conducted on the same material yield different results depending upon the temperature of the specimen and the speed of the loading. When performing Watts-Ford tests, temperatures of the metal specimens will vary from 800 to 1100 °C and strain rates of (0.01- 10 s-1).

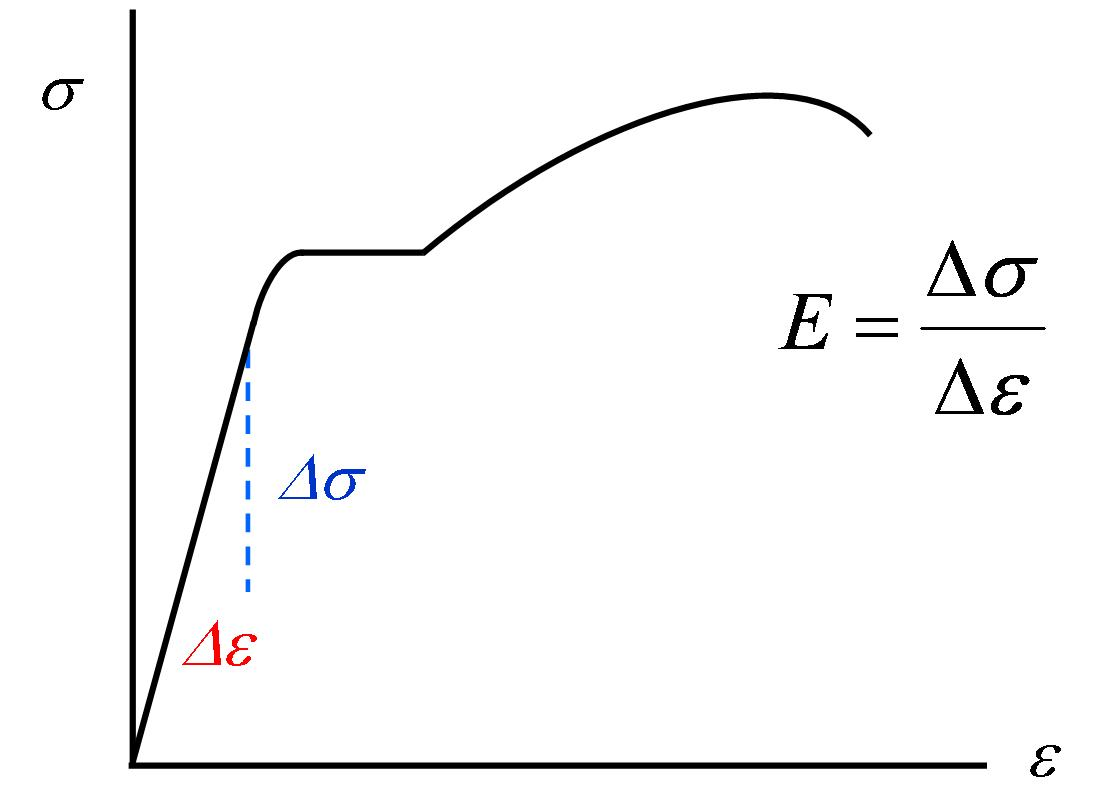
Stress-strain curve

Pressure

The average pressure on a unit of area of the contact surface between the punch and the specimen is expressed as: P= F/(wb), where F is force, w is the punch width, b is the specimen width.

== See also ==
- Compression (physics)
- Compressive strength
- Shear stress
