= Albert Portevin =

French metallurgist

Albert Marcel Germain René Portevin (1 November 1880 – 12 April 1962) was a French metallurgist who contributed to the development of chromium based stainless steels. He was also involved in studies on tensile stress and deformation and the so-called Portevin–Le Chatelier effect is named after him and François Le Châtelier.

Portevin was born in Paris where his mother raised him following the early death of his father. He studied chemistry at the École centrale des arts et manufactures in 1899 and continued to work there. He became a professor in 1925. He studied steel alloys in 1905 at the Établissements de Dion-Bouton and used micrography to examine chrome steels of varying chrome content for their resistance to corrosion. Greater than 9% chromium made steel resistant to acids. After identifying the optimal chrome level he was involved in reducing the problem caused by brittleness. Portevin examined cooling curves for Cadmium Bismuth alloys and began to conduct thermal analysis to study shrinkage, brittleness and hardness. He defined measures of castability (the ability to fill moulds), the weldability and hardenability. He found ways to reduce the brittleness of stainless steels to make them amenable to production processes by studies on the transitions between martensite and austenite.

Portevin edited the journal Revue de métallurgie from 1907 and taught at the École supérieure de fonderie et de forge. He was elected to the French Academy of Sciences in 1942 and served as its president in 1959. He was elected Foreign Member of the Royal Society in 1952 and made Grand Officier of the Legion d'Honneur in 1954.
