= Compression (physics) =

Application of balanced forces which push inwards on an object

Uniaxial compression

In mechanics, compression is the application of balanced inward ("pushing") forces to different points on a material or structure, that is, forces with no net sum or torque directed so as to reduce its size in one or more directions. It is contrasted with tension or traction, the application of balanced outward ("pulling") forces, and with shearing forces, directed so as to displace layers of the material parallel to each other. The compressive strength of materials and structures is an important engineering consideration.

In uniaxial compression, the forces are directed along one direction only, so that they act towards decreasing the object's length along that direction. The compressive forces may also be applied in multiple directions; for example inwards along the edges of a plate or all over the side surface of a cylinder, so as to reduce its area (biaxial compression), or inwards over the entire surface of a body, so as to reduce its volume.

Technically, a material is under a state of compression, at some specific point and along a specific direction $x$, if the normal component of the stress vector across a surface with normal direction $x$ is directed opposite to $x$. If the stress vector itself is opposite to $x$, the material is said to be under normal compression or pure compressive stress along $x$. In a solid, the amount of compression generally depends on the direction $x$, and the material may be under compression along some directions but under traction along others. If the stress vector is purely compressive and has the same magnitude for all directions, the material is said to be under isotropic compression, hydrostatic compression, or bulk compression. This is the only type of static compression that liquids and gases can bear. It affects the volume of the material, as quantified by the bulk modulus and the volumetric strain.

The inverse process of compression is called decompression, dilation, or expansion, in which the object enlarges or increases in volume.

In a mechanical wave, which is longitudinal, the medium is displaced in the wave's direction, resulting in areas of compression and rarefaction.

== Effects ==
When put under compression (or any other type of stress), every material will suffer some deformation, even if imperceptible, that causes the average relative positions of its atoms and molecules to change. The deformation may be permanent, or may be reversed when the compression forces disappear. In the latter case, the deformation gives rise to reaction forces that oppose the compression forces, and may eventually balance them.

Liquids and gases cannot bear steady uniaxial or biaxial compression, they will deform promptly and permanently and will not offer any permanent reaction force. However they can bear isotropic compression, and may be compressed in other ways momentarily, for instance in a sound wave.

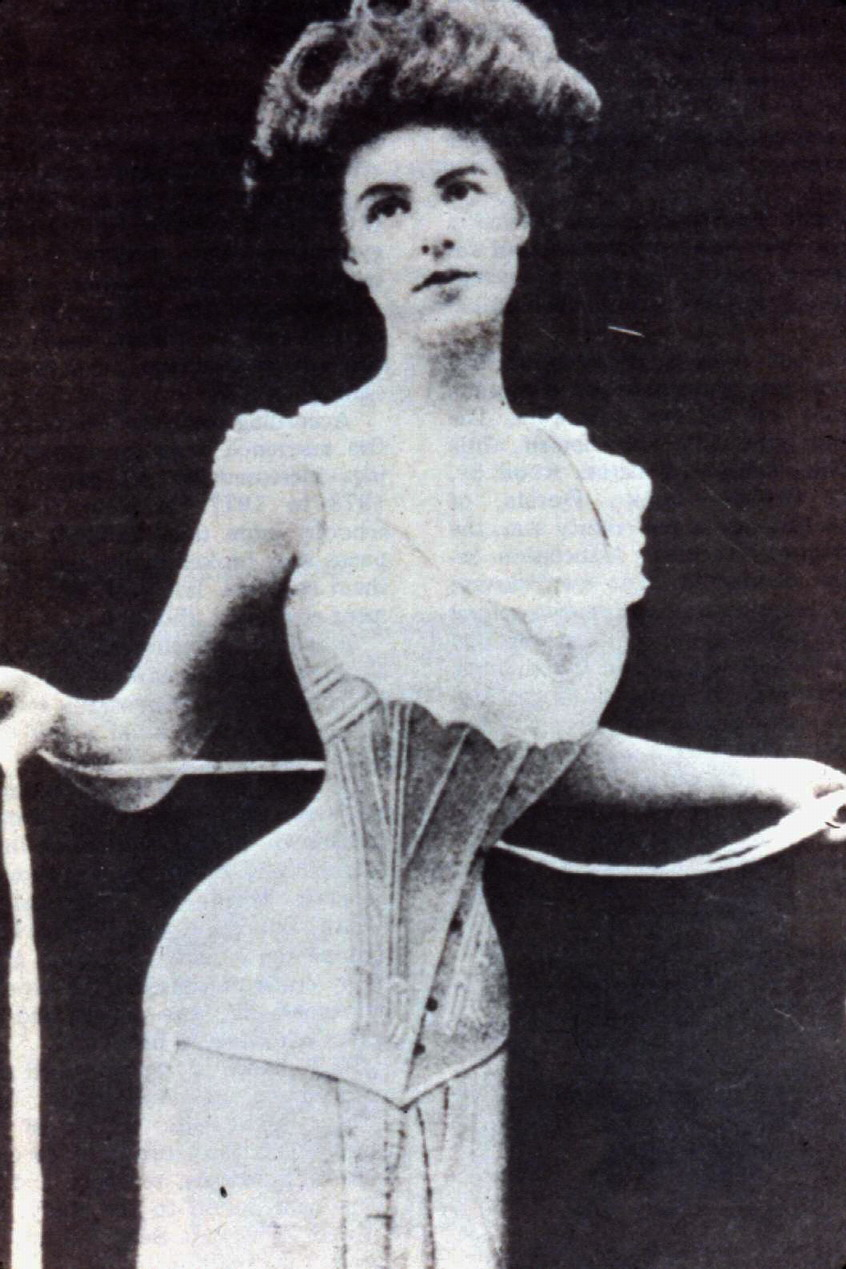
Tightening a corset applies biaxial compression to the waist.

Every ordinary material will contract in volume when put under isotropic compression, contract in cross-section area when put under uniform biaxial compression, and contract in length when put into uniaxial compression. The deformation may not be uniform and may not be aligned with the compression forces. What happens in the directions where there is no compression depends on the material. Most materials will expand in those directions, but some special materials will remain unchanged or even contract. In general, the relation between the stress applied to a material and the resulting deformation is a central topic of continuum mechanics.

== Uses ==
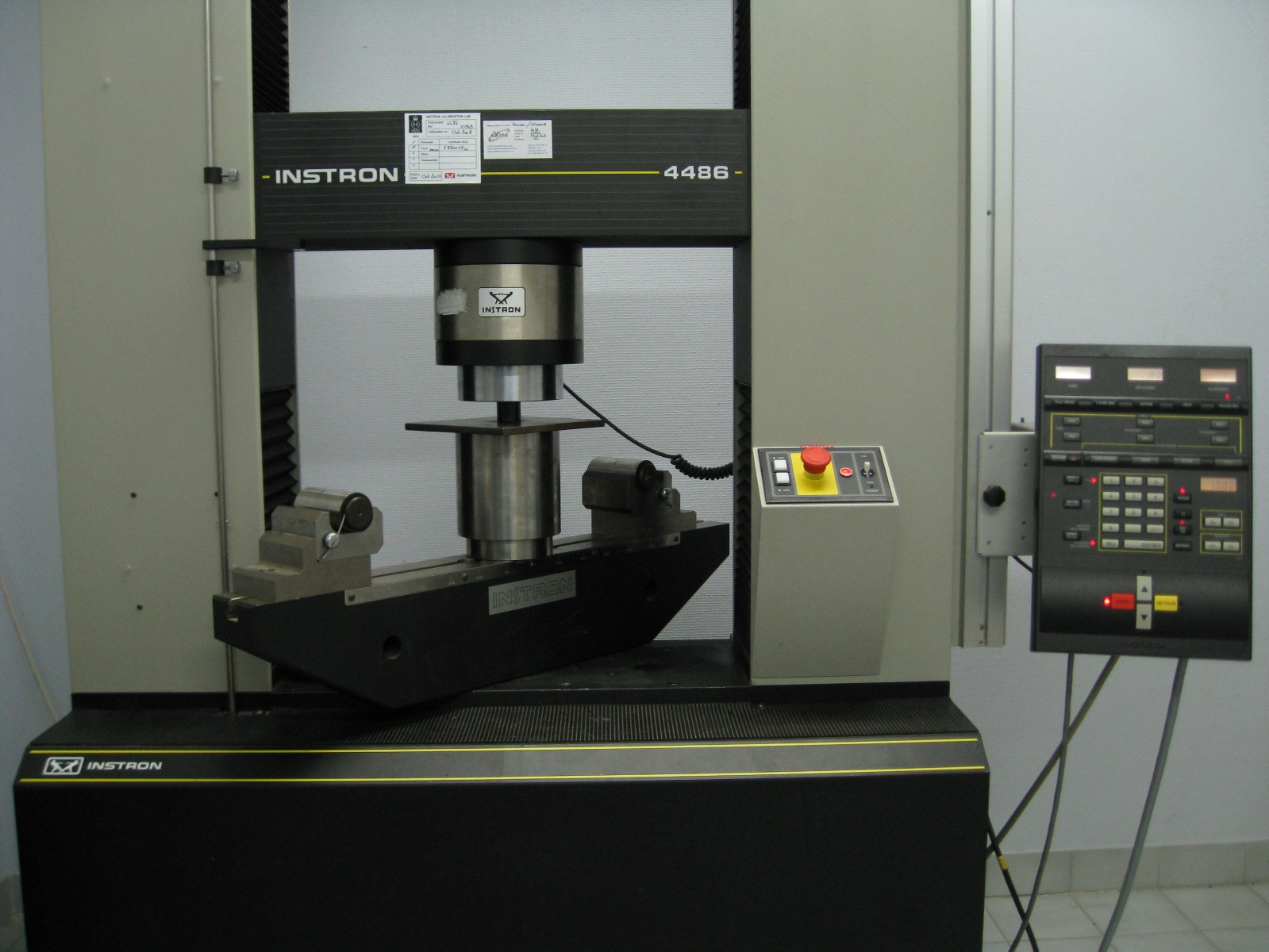
Compression test on a universal testing machine

Compression of solids has many implications in materials science, physics and structural engineering, for compression yields noticeable amounts of stress and tension.

By inducing compression, mechanical properties such as compressive strength or modulus of elasticity, can be measured.

Compression machines range from very small table top systems to ones with over 53 MN capacity.

Gases are often stored and shipped in highly compressed form, to save space. Slightly compressed air or other gases are also used to fill balloons, rubber boats, and other inflatable structures. Compressed liquids are used in hydraulic equipment and in fracking.

== In engines ==
=== Internal combustion engines ===
In internal combustion engines the explosive mixture gets compressed before it is ignited; the compression improves the efficiency of the engine. In the Otto cycle, for instance, the second stroke of the piston effects the compression of the charge which has been drawn into the cylinder by the first forward stroke.

=== Steam engines ===
The term is applied to the arrangement by which the exhaust valve of a steam engine is made to close, shutting a portion of the exhaust steam in the cylinder, before the stroke of the piston is quite complete. This steam being compressed as the stroke is completed, a cushion is formed against which the piston does work while its velocity is being rapidly reduced, and thus the stresses in the mechanism due to the inertia of the reciprocating parts are lessened. This compression, moreover, obviates the shock which would otherwise be caused by the admission of the fresh steam for the return stroke.

== See also ==
- Buckling
- Container compression test
- Compression member
- Compressive strength
- Longitudinal wave
- P-wave
- Rarefaction
- Strength of materials
- Résal effect
- Plane strain compression test
