= Lüders band =

Bands of plastic deformation in metals

Lüders bands are a type of plastic bands, slip band or stretcher-strain mark which are formed due to localized bands of plastic deformation in metals experiencing tensile stresses, common to low-carbon steels and certain Al-Mg alloys. First reported by Guillaume Piobert, and later by W. Lüders, the mechanism that stimulates their appearance is known as dynamic strain aging, or the inhibition of dislocation motion by interstitial atoms (in steels, typically carbon and nitrogen), around which "atmospheres" or "zones" naturally congregate.

Figure 1: Measured strain distribution of a tensile test (shape memory alloy) during loading and unloading shows moving Lüders bands. The measurement was performed with a LIMESS Digital image correlation system.

As internal stresses tend to be highest at the shoulders of tensile test specimens, band formation is favored in those areas. However, the formation of Lüders bands depends primarily on the microscopic (i.e. average grain size and crystal structure, if applicable) and macroscopic geometries of the material. For example, a tensile-tested steel bar with a square cross-section tends to develop comparatively more bands than would a bar of identical composition having a circular cross-section.

The formation of a Lüders band is preceded by a yield point and a drop in the flow stress. Then the band appears as a localized event of a single band between plastically deformed and undeformed material that moves with the constant cross head velocity. The Lüders Band usually starts at one end of the specimen and propagates toward the other end. The visible front on the material usually makes a well-defined angle typically 50–55° from the specimen axis as it moves down the sample. During the propagation of the band the nominal stress–strain curve is flat. After the band has passed through the material the deformation proceeds uniformly with positive strain hardening. Sometimes Lüders band transition into the Portevin–Le Chatelier effect while changing the temperature or strain rate, this implies these are related phenomena Lüders bands are known as a strain softening instability.

If a sample is stretched beyond the range of the Lüder strain once, no Lüder strain occurs any more when the sample is deformed again, since the dislocations have already torn themselves away from the interstitial atoms. For this reason, deep drawing sheets are often cold rolled in advance to prevent the formation of stretcher-strain marks during the actual deep drawing process. The formation of Lüder bands can occur again with a deformation over time, since the interstitial atoms accumulate by diffusing processes called precipitation hardening (or aging).

== See also ==
- Portevin–Le Chatelier effect
- Adiabatic shear band
- Persistent slip bands
