= Stress–strain curve =

Curve representing a material's response to applied forces

Stress–strain curve typical of a low-carbon steel

Stress–strain curve for a tensile test

In engineering and materials science, a stress–strain curve for a material gives the relationship between the applied pressure, known as stress, and amount of deformation, known as strain. It is obtained by gradually applying load to a test object and measuring the deformation, from which the stress and strain can be determined (see tensile testing). These curves reveal many of the properties of a material, such as the Young's modulus, the yield strength, and the ultimate tensile strength.

== Definition ==
Generally speaking, curves that represent the relationship between stress and strain in any form of deformation can be regarded as stress–strain curves. The stress and strain can be normal, shear, or a mixture, and can also be uniaxial, biaxial, or multiaxial, and can even change with time. The form of deformation can be compression, stretching, torsion, rotation, and so on. If not specified otherwise, the term "stress–strain curve" typically refers to the relationship between the axial normal stress and axial normal strain of materials measured in a tension test.

There are two ways that stress and strain are commonly defined mathematically. These are Engineering stress-strain, and True stress-strain. The difference between the two definitions depends on whether the change in area of material cross section is being considered.

Engineering Stress is defined:

$\sigma = \frac{F}{A_{0}}$

Engineering Strain is defined:

$\epsilon = \frac{\Delta l}{l_{0}}$

Where:

- $F$ is defined as the instantaneous load applied perpendicular to the sample cross section.
- $A_{0}$ is defined as the original cross sectional area of the sample.
- $l_{0}$ is defined as the original measured length of the sample.
- $\Delta l$ is defined as the difference between instantaneous measured length and original length of the sample.

True Stress is defined:

$\sigma_{T} = \frac{F}{A_{i}}$

True Strain is defined:

$\epsilon_{T} = ln ( \frac{l_{i}}{l_{0}} )$

Where:

- $F$ is defined as the instantaneous load applied perpendicular to the sample cross section.
- $A_{i}$ is the instantaneous cross-sectional area of the sample.
- $l_{i}$ is the instantaneous measured length of the sample.
- $l_{0}$ is the original measured length of the sample.

== Stages ==
Yield stress increases as strain rate increases.

A schematic diagram for the stress–strain curve of low carbon steel at room temperature is shown in figure 1. There are several stages showing different behaviors, which suggests different mechanical properties. To clarify, materials can miss one or more stages shown in figure 1, or have totally different stages.

=== Linear elastic region ===
The first stage is the linear elastic region. The stress is proportional to the strain, that is, obeys the general Hooke's law, and the slope is Young's modulus. In this region, the material undergoes only elastic deformation. The end of the stage is the initiation point of plastic deformation. The stress component of this point is defined as yield strength (or upper yield point, UYP for short).

=== Strain hardening region ===
The second stage is the strain hardening region. This region starts as the stress goes beyond the yielding point, reaching a maximum at the ultimate strength point, which is the maximal stress that can be sustained and is called the ultimate tensile strength (UTS). In this region, the stress mainly increases as the material elongates, except that for some materials, such as steel, there is a nearly flat region at the beginning. The stress of the flat region is defined as the lower yield point (LYP) and results from the formation and propagation of Lüders bands. Explicitly, heterogeneous plastic deformation forms bands at the upper yield strength and these bands carrying with deformation spread along the sample at the lower yield strength. After the sample is again uniformly deformed, the increase of stress with the progress of extension results from work strengthening, that is, dense dislocations induced by plastic deformation hampers the further motion of dislocations. To overcome these obstacles, a higher resolved shear stress should be applied. As the strain accumulates, work strengthening gets reinforced, until the stress reaches the ultimate tensile strength.

=== Necking region ===
The third stage is the necking region. Beyond ultimate tensile strength, a necking forms where the local cross-sectional area becomes significantly smaller than the average. The necking deformation is heterogeneous and will reinforce itself as the stress concentrates more at the reduced section. Such positive feedback leads to quick development of necking and leads to fracture. Note that though the pulling force is decreasing, the work strengthening is still progressing, that is, the true stress keeps growing but the engineering stress decreases because the shrinking section area is not considered. This region ends up with the fracture. After fracture, percent elongation and reduction in section area can be calculated.

== Classification ==
Stress–strain curve for brittle materials compared to ductile materials

Some common characteristics among the stress–strain curves can be distinguished with various groups of materials and, on this basis, to divide materials into two broad categories; namely, the ductile materials and the brittle materials.

=== Ductile materials ===
Ductile materials, including structural steel and many other metals, are characterized by their ability to yield at normal temperatures. For example, low-carbon steel generally exhibits a very linear stress–strain relationship up to a well-defined yield point. The linear portion of the curve is the elastic region, and the slope of this region is the modulus of elasticity or Young's modulus. Plastic flow initiates at the upper yield point and continues at the lower yield point.

The appearance of the upper yield point is associated with the pinning of dislocations in the system. Permanent deformation occurs once dislocations are forced to move past pinning points. Initially, this permanent deformation is non-uniformly distributed along the sample. During this process, dislocations escape from Cottrell atmospheres within the material. The resulting slip bands appear at the lower yield point and propagate along the gauge length, at constant stress, until the Lüders strain is reached, and deformation becomes uniform.

Beyond the Lüders strain, the stress increases due to strain hardening until it reaches the ultimate tensile stress. During this stage, the cross-sectional area decreases uniformly along the gauge length, due to the incompressibility of plastic flow (not because of the Poisson effect, which is an elastic phenomenon). Then a process of necking begins, which ends in a 'cup and cone' fracture characteristic of ductile materials.

The appearance of necking in ductile materials is associated with geometrical instability in the system. Due to the natural inhomogeneity of the material, it is common to find some regions with small inclusions or porosity, within the material or on its surface, where strain will concentrate, leading to a local reduction in cross-sectional area. For strain less than the ultimate tensile strain, the increase of work-hardening rate in this region will be greater than the area reduction rate, thereby make this region harder to deform than others, so that the instability will be removed, i.e. the material increases in homogeneity before reaching the ultimate strain. However, beyond this, the work hardening rate will decrease, such that a region with smaller area is weaker than nearby regions, therefore reduction in area will concentrate in this region and the neck will become more and more pronounced until fracture. After the neck has formed in the material, further plastic deformation is concentrated in the neck while the remainder of the material undergoes elastic contraction owing to the decrease in tensile force.

The stress–strain curve for a ductile material can be approximated using the Ramberg–Osgood equation. This equation is straightforward to implement, and only requires the material's yield strength, ultimate strength, elastic modulus, and percent elongation.

==== Toughness ====
Toughness as defined by the area under the stress–strain curve

Materials that are both strong and ductile are classified as tough. Toughness is a material property defined as the area under the stress-strain curve.

Toughness can be determined by integrating the stress-strain curve. It is the energy of mechanical deformation per unit volume prior to fracture. The explicit mathematical description is:
$$\tfrac{\mbox{energy}}{\mbox{volume}} = \int_{0}^{\varepsilon_f} \sigma\, d\varepsilon$$
where

- $\varepsilon$ is strain
- $\varepsilon_f$ is the strain upon failure
- $\sigma$ is stress

=== Brittle materials ===
Brittle materials, which include cast iron, glass, and stone, are characterized by the fact that rupture occurs without any noticeable prior change in the rate of elongation, sometimes they fracture before yielding.

Brittle materials such as concrete or carbon fiber do not have a well-defined yield point, and do not strain-harden. Therefore, the ultimate strength and breaking strength are the same. Typical brittle materials like glass do not show any plastic deformation but fail while the deformation is elastic. One of the characteristics of a brittle failure is that the two broken parts can be reassembled to produce the same shape as the original component as there will not be a neck formation like in the case of ductile materials. A typical stress–strain curve for a brittle material will be linear. For some materials, such as concrete, tensile strength is negligible compared to the compressive strength and it is assumed to be zero for many engineering applications. Glass fibers have a tensile strength greater than that of steel, but bulk glass usually does not. This is because of the stress intensity factor associated with defects in the material. As the size of the sample gets larger, the expected size of the largest defect also grows.

== See also ==
- Elastomers
- Plane strain compression test
- Strength of materials
- Stress–strain index
- Tensometer
- Universal testing machine
