= Universal testing machine =

Type of equipment for determining tensile or compressive strength of a material

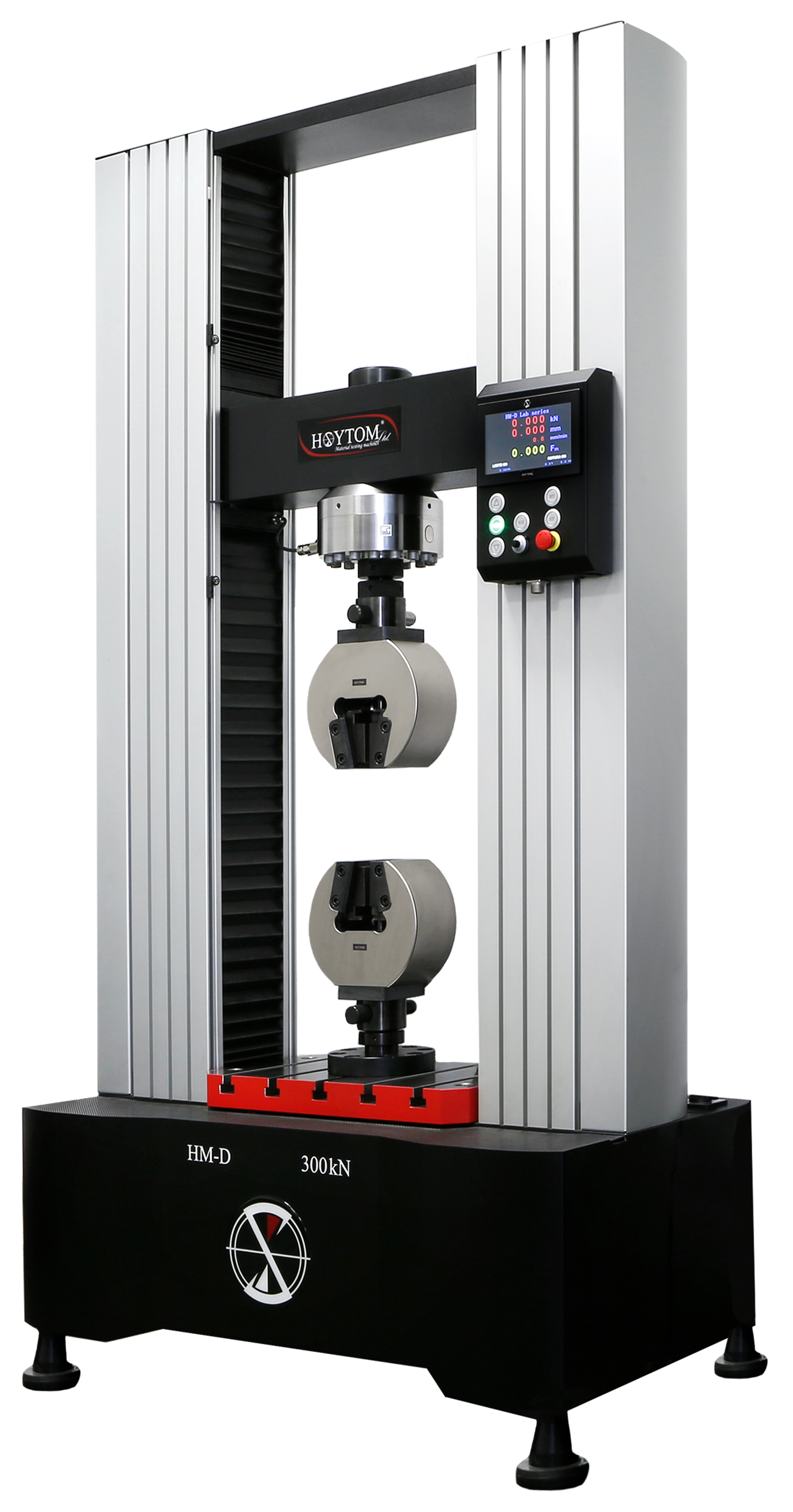
Typical electromechanical Universal Testing Machine

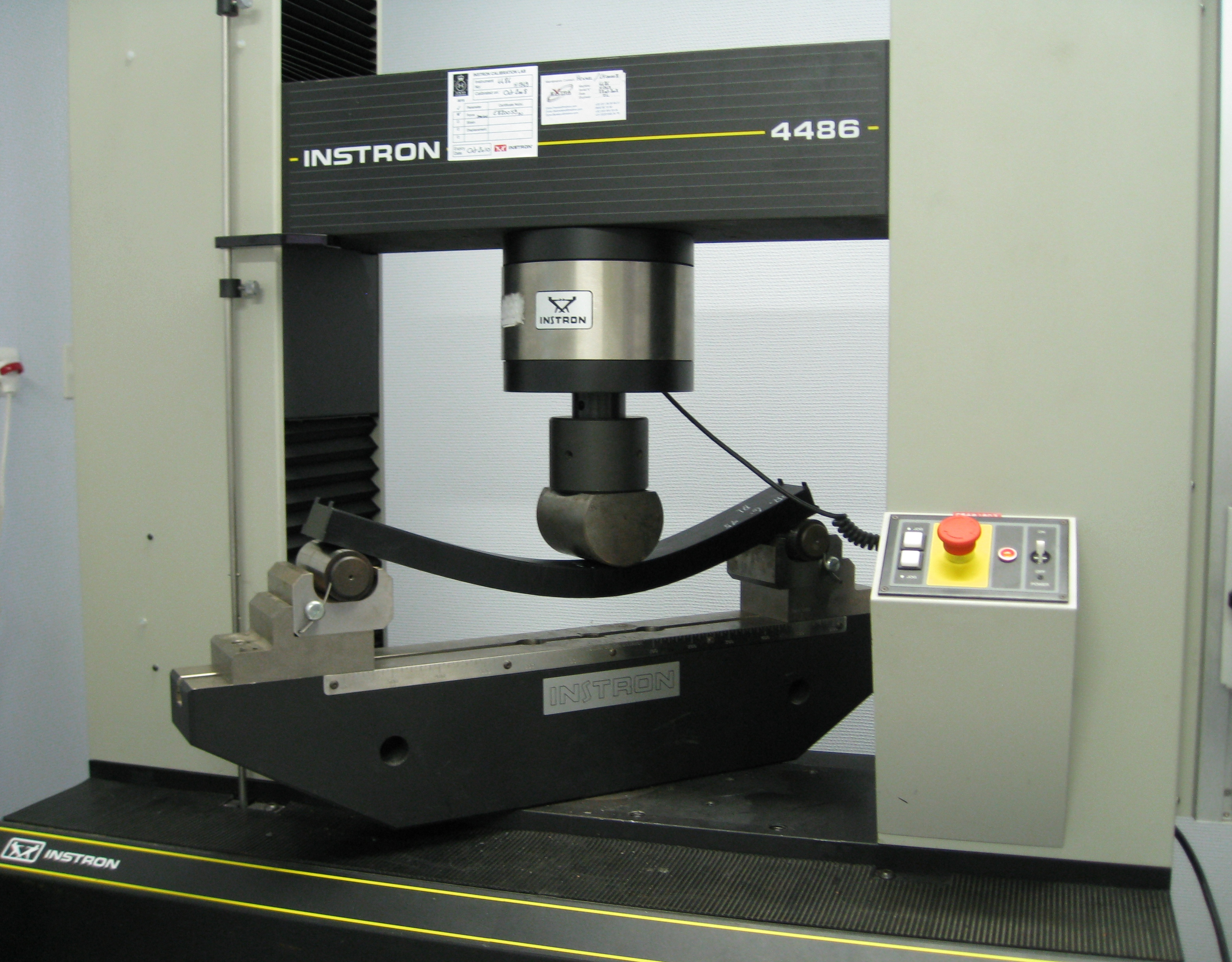
Test fixture for three point flex test

A universal testing machine (UTM), also known as a universal tester, universal tensile machine, materials testing machine, materials test frame, is used to test the tensile strength (pulling) and compressive strength (pushing), flexural strength, bending, shear, hardness, and torsion testing, providing valuable data for designing and ensuring the quality of materials. An earlier name for a tensile testing machine is a tensometer. The "universal" part of the name reflects that it can perform many standard tests application on materials, components, and structures (in other words, that it is versatile).

== Electromechanical and Hydraulic Testing System ==
An electromechanical UTM utilizes an electric motor to apply a controlled force, while a hydraulic UTM uses hydraulic systems for force application. Electromechanical UTMs are favored for their precision, speed, and ease of use, making them suitable for a wide range of applications, including tensile, compression, and flexural testing.

On the other hand, hydraulic UTMs are capable of generating higher forces and are often used for testing high-strength materials such as metals and alloys, where extreme force applications are required. Both types of UTMs play critical roles in various industries including aerospace, automotive, construction, and materials science, enabling engineers and researchers to accurately assess the mechanical properties of materials for design, quality control, and research purposes.

== Components ==
Several variations are in use. Common components include:

- Load frame - Usually consisting of two strong supports for the machine. Some small machines have a single support.
- Load cell - A force transducer or other means of measuring the load is required. Periodic calibration is usually required by governing regulations or quality system.
- Cross head - A movable cross head (crosshead) is controlled to move up or down. Usually this is at a constant speed: sometimes called a constant rate of extension (CRE) machine. Some machines can program the crosshead speed or conduct cyclical testing, testing at constant force, testing at constant deformation, etc. Electromechanical, servo-hydraulic, linear drive, and resonance drive are used.
- Means of measuring extension or deformation - Many tests require a measure of the response of the test specimen to the movement of the cross head. Extensometers are sometimes used.
- Control Panel and Software Device - Providing the test result with parameters set by the user for data acquisition and analysis. Some older machines have dial or digital displays and chart recorders. Many newer machines have a computer interface for analysis and printing.
- Conditioning - Many tests require controlled conditioning (temperature, humidity, pressure, etc.). The machine can be in a controlled room or a special environmental chamber can be placed around the test specimen for the test.
- Test fixtures, specimen holding jaws, and related sample making equipment are called for in many test methods.

== Use ==
Stress–strain curve showing typical yield behavior for nonferrous alloys (stress, $\sigma$, shown as a function of strain, $\epsilon$): 1. True elastic limit; 2. Proportionality limit; 3. Elastic limit; 4. Offset yield strength

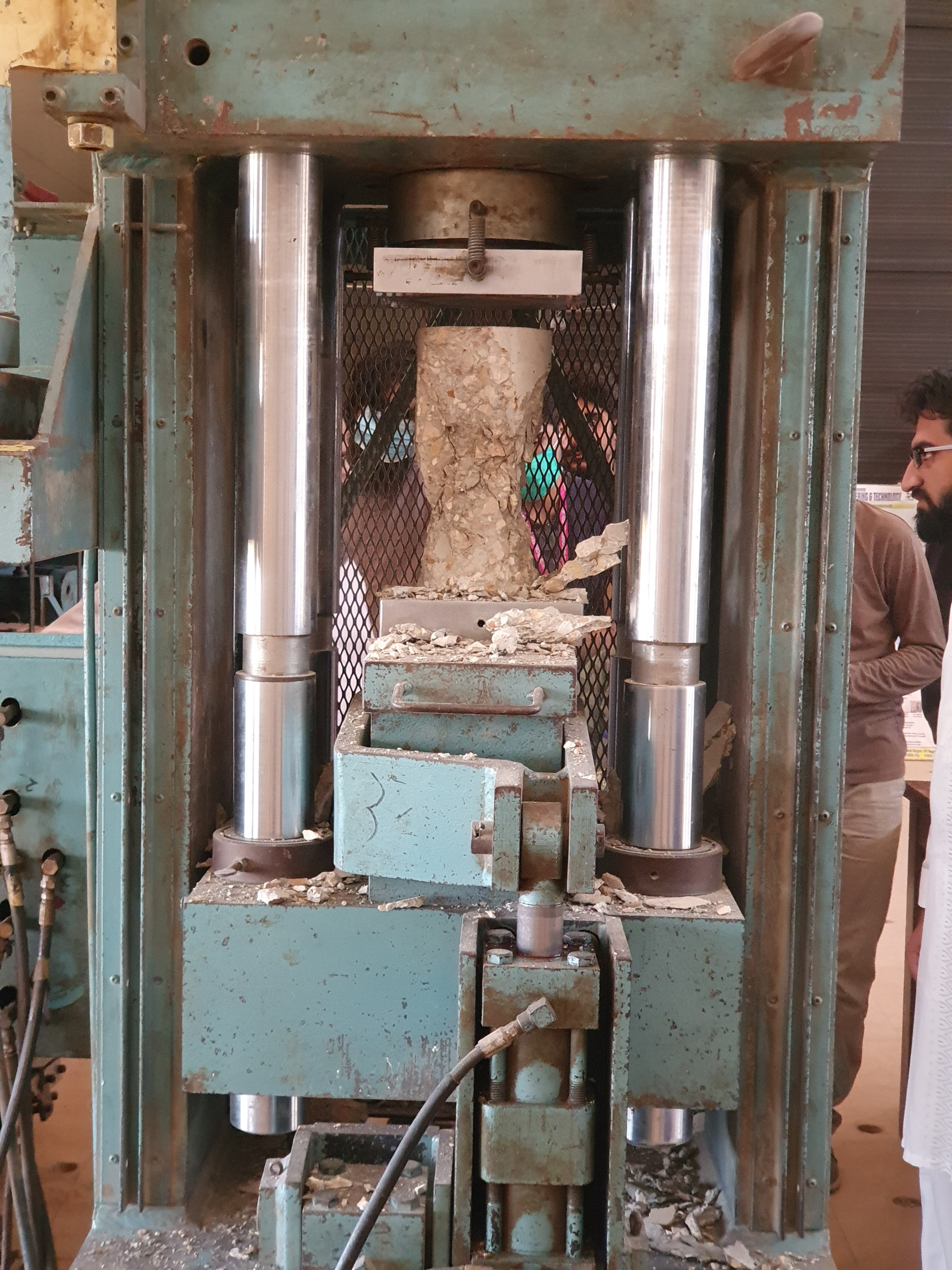
A concrete cylinder being tested under a UTM

The set-up and usage are detailed in a test method, often published by a standards organization. This specifies the sample preparation, fixturing, gauge length (the length which is under study or observation), analysis, etc.

The specimen is placed in the machine between the grips and an extensometer if required can automatically record the change in gauge length during the test. If an extensometer is not fitted, the machine itself can record the d e systems including any slipping of the specimen in the grips.

Once the machine is started it begins to apply an increasing load on specimen. Throughout the tests the control system and its associated software record the load and extension or compression of the specimen.

Machines range from very small table top systems to ones with over 53 MN (12 million lbf) capacity.

== See also ==
- Modulus of elasticity
- Stress-strain curve
- Young's modulus
- Necking (engineering)
- Fatigue testing
- Hydraulic press
