= 475 °C embrittlement =

Loss of plasticity in ferritic stainless steel

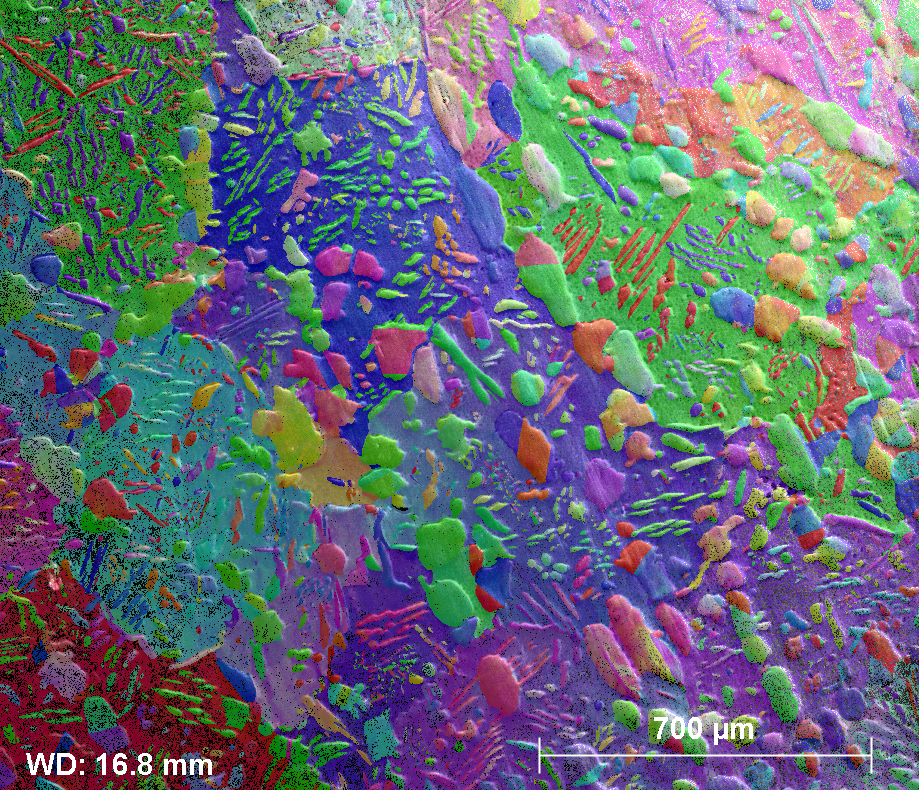
Electron backscatter diffraction map of 128 hrs age hardened duplex stainless steel with the ferrite phase forming the matrix and austenite grains sporadically spread. The ferrite phase volume fraction is 58%.

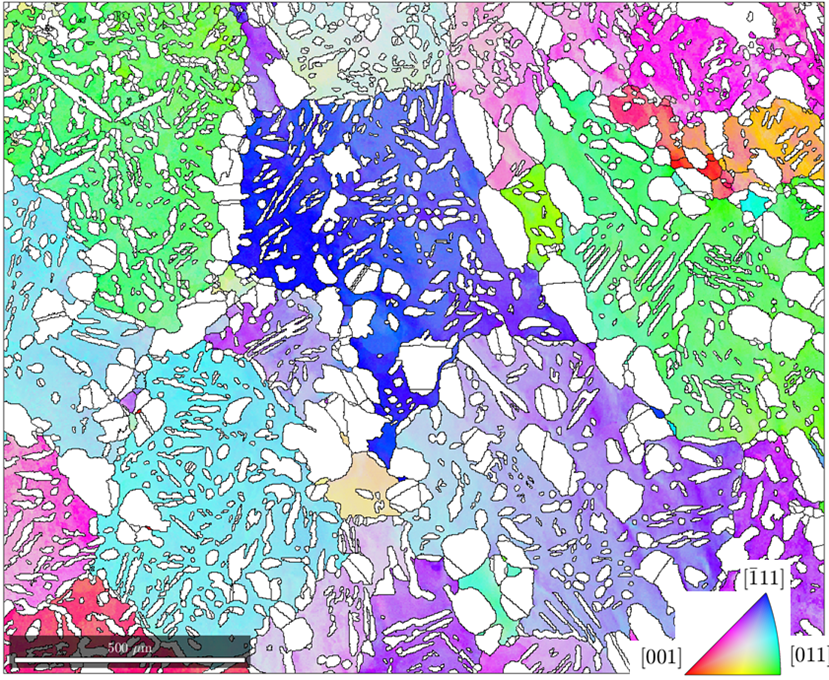
EBSD map with austenite grains excluded (white). The scale bar is 500 µm. Colours denote the crystal orientation and are taken from the inverse pole figure at the lower right corner.

Duplex stainless steels are a family of alloys with a two-phase microstructure consisting of both austenitic (face-centred cubic) and ferritic (body-centred cubic) phases. They offer excellent mechanical properties, corrosion resistance, and toughness compared to other types of stainless steel. However, duplex stainless steel can be susceptible to a phenomenon known as 475 °C (887 °F) embrittlement or duplex stainless steel age hardening, which is a type of aging process that causes loss of plasticity in duplex stainless steel when it is heated in the range of 250 to 550 °C (480 to 1,020 °F). At this temperature range, spontaneous phase separation of the ferrite phase into iron-rich and chromium-rich nanophases occurs, with no change in the mechanical properties of the austenite phase. This type of embrittlement is due to precipitation hardening, which makes the material become brittle and prone to cracking.

== Duplex stainless steel ==
Duplex stainless steel is a type of stainless steel that has a two-phase microstructure consisting of both austenitic (face-centred cubic) and ferritic (body-centred cubic) phases. This dual-phase structure gives duplex stainless steel a combination of mechanical and corrosion-resistant properties that are superior to those of either austenitic or ferritic stainless steel alone. The austenitic phase provides the steel with good ductility, high toughness, and high corrosion resistance, especially in acidic and chloride-containing environments. The ferritic phase, on the other hand, provides the steel with good strength, high resistance to stress corrosion cracking, and high resistance to pitting and crevice corrosion. They are therefore used extensively in the offshore oil and gas industry for pipework systems, manifolds, risers, etc. and in the petrochemical industry in the form of pipelines and pressure vessels.

A duplex stainless steel mixture of austenite and ferrite microstructure is not necessarily in equal proportions, and where the alloy solidifies as ferrite, it is partially transformed to austenite when the temperature falls to around 1,000 °C (1,830 °F). Duplex steels have a higher chromium content compared to austenitic stainless steel, 20–28%; higher molybdenum, up to 5%; lower nickel, up to 9%; and 0.05–0.50% nitrogen. Thus, duplex stainless steel alloys have good corrosion resistance and higher strength than standard austenitic stainless steels such as type 304 or 316.

Alpha (α) phase is a ferritic phase with body-centred cubic (BCC) structure, Im$\bar{3}$m [229] space group, 2.866 Å lattice parameter, and has one twinning system {112}<111> and three slip systems {110}<111>, {112}<111> and {123}<111>; however, the last system rarely activates. Gamma ($\gamma$) phase is austenitic with a face-centred cubic (FCC) structure, Fm$\bar{3}$m [225] space group, and 3.66 Å lattice parameter. It normally has more nickel, copper, and interstitial carbon and nitrogen. Plastic deformation occurs in austenite more readily than in ferrite. During deformation, straight slip bands form in the austenite grains and propagate to the ferrite-austenite grain boundaries, assisting in the slipping of the ferrite phase. Curved slip bands also form due to the bulk-ferrite-grain deformation. The formation of slip bands indicates a concentrated unidirectional slip on certain planes causing a stress concentration.

== Age hardening by spinodal decomposition ==
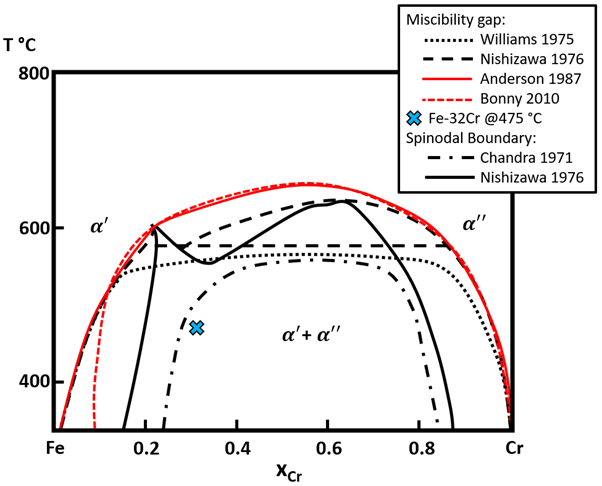
Calculated metastable miscibility gap in the Fe-Cr binary system (remake of)

Duplex stainless steel can have limited toughness due to its large ferritic grain size, and its tendencies to hardening and embrittlement, i.e., loss of plasticity, at temperatures ranging from 250 to 550 °C (482 to 1,022 °F), especially at 475 °C (887 °F). At this temperature range, spinodal decomposition of the supersaturated solid ferrite solution into iron-rich nanophase ($\acute{a}$) and chromium-rich nanophase ($\acute{a}\acute{}$), accompanied by G-phase precipitation, occurs. This makes the ferrite phase a preferential initiation site for micro-cracks. This is because aging encourages Σ3 {112}<111> ferrite deformation twinning at slow strain rate and room temperature in tensile or compressive deformation, nucleating from local stress concentration sites, and parent-twinning boundaries, with 60° (in or out) misorientation, are suitable for cleavage crack nucleation.

Spinodal decomposition refers to the spontaneous separation of a phase into two coherent phases via uphill diffusion, i.e., from a region of lower concentration to a region of higher concentration resulting in a negative diffusion coefficient ${d^2G \over dx^2}$, without a barrier to nucleation due to the phase being thermodynamically unstable (i.e., miscibility gap, $\acute{a}$ + $\acute{a}\acute{}$ region in the figure), where $G$ is the Gibbs free energy per mole of solution and the composition. It increases hardness and decreases magneticity. Miscibility gap describes the region in a phase diagram below the melting point of each compound where the solid phase splits into the liquid of two separated stable phases.

For 475 °C embrittlement to occur, the chromium content needs to exceed 12%. The addition of nickel accelerates the spinodal decomposition by promoting the iron-rich nanophase formation. Nitrogen changes the distribution of chromium, nickel, and molybdenum in the ferrite phase but does not prevent the phase decomposition. Other elements like molybdenum, manganese, and silicon do not affect the formation of iron-rich nanophase. However, manganese and molybdenum partition to the iron-rich nanophase, while nickel partitions to the chromium-rich nanophase.

== Microscopy characterisation ==
Microstructural evolution under the Cahn–Hilliard equation, demonstrating distinctive coarsening and phase separation

Using Field Emission Gun Transmission Electron Microscope FEG-TEM, the nanometre-scaled modulated structure of the decomposed ferrite was revealed as chromium-rich nanophase gave the bright image, and iron-rich darker image. It also revealed that these modulated nanophases grow coarser with aging time. Decomposed phases start as irregular rounded shapes with no particular arrangement, but with time the chromium-rich nanophase takes a plat shape aligned in the <110> directions.

== Consequences ==
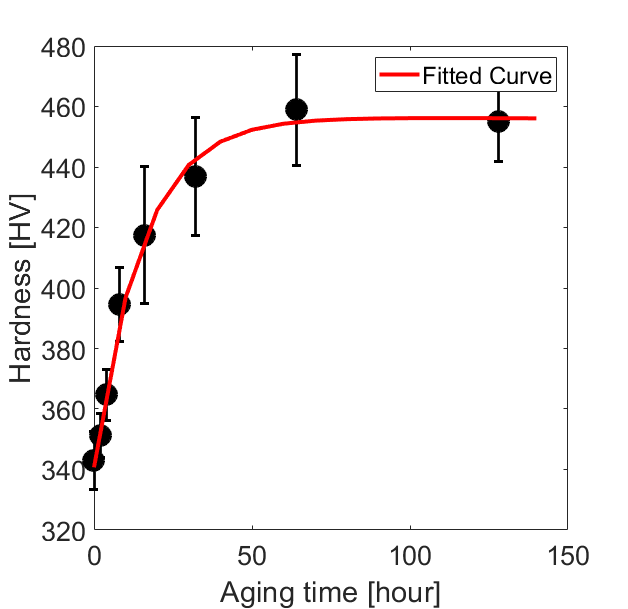
Change of hardness (measured using diamond Vicker indenter and expressed in Vickers Pyramid Number, HV) with 2, 4, 8, 16, 32, 64, and 128 hours aging time for the ferrite phase in super-duplex Zeron 100 alloy. The indent was done in 11 widely separated locations in each aged sample.

Spinodal decomposition increases the hardening of the material due to the misfit between the chromium-rich and iron-rich nano-phases, internal stress, and variation of elastic modulus. The formation of coherent precipitates induces an equal but opposite strain, raising the system's free energy depending on the precipitate shape and matrix and precipitate elastic properties. Around a spherical inclusion, the distortion is purely hydrostatic.

G-phase precipitates appear prominently at grain boundaries. and are phase rich in nickel, titanium, and silicon, but chromium and manganese may substitute titanium sites. G-phase precipitates occur during long-term aging, are encouraged by increasing nickel content in the ferrite phase, and reduce corrosion resistance significantly. It has ellipsoid morphology, FCC structure (Fm$\bar{3}$m), and 11.4 Å lattice parameter, with a diameter less than 50 nm that increases with aging.

Thus, the embrittlement is caused by dislocations impediment/ locking by the spinodally decomposed matrix and strain around G-phase precipitates, i.e., internal stress relaxation by the formation of Cottrell atmosphere.

Furthermore, the ferrite hardness increases with aging time, the hardness of the ductile austenite phase remains nearly unchanged due to faster diffusivity in ferrite compared to the austenite. However, austenite undergoes a substitutional redistribution of elements, enhancing galvanic corrosion between the two phases.

== Treatment ==
550 °C heat treatment can reverse spinodal decomposition but not affect the G-phase precipitates. The ferrite matrix spinodal decomposition can be substantially reversed by introducing an external pulsed electric current that changes the system's free energy due to the difference in electrical conductivity between the nanophases and the dissolution of G-phase precipitates.

Cyclic loading suppresses spinodal decomposition, and radiation accelerates it but changes the decomposition nature from an interconnected network of modulated nanophases to isolated islands.
