= Erich Schmid (physicist) =

Austrian physicist (1896–1983)

Erich Schmid (4 May 1896, in Bruck an der Mur – 22 October 1983, in Vienna) was a physicist from Austria. He made important discoveries in the field of crystal plasticity.

Schmid studied physics and mathematics at the University of Vienna and received his doctorate in 1920 under the supervision of Felix Ehrenhaft. He then became the assistant of Ludwig Flamm. In 1951 he accepted a position at the University of Vienna and stayed there until retiring in 1967.

One of his most successful contributions is the book "Plasticity of Crystals: with special reference to metals" ("Kristallplastizität: Mit Besonderer Berücksichtigung der Metalle") which he coauthored with Walter Boas. In 1960 the Austrian Academy of Sciences awarded him the Erwin Schrödinger Prize and named the institute for material sciences after him ("Erich Schmid Institute of Materials Science"). He was also awarded the Wilhelm Exner Medal, the Austrian Decoration for Science and Art and the Ring of Honour of the City of Vienna.

The Schmid Factor (or Schmid's Law) is named for him.
