= J-integral =

Calculation of strain energy release rate

The J-integral represents a way to calculate the strain energy release rate, or work (energy) per unit fracture surface area, in a material. The theoretical concept of J-integral was developed in 1967 by G. P. Cherepanov and independently in 1968 by James R. Rice, who showed that an energetic contour path integral (called J) was independent of the path around a crack.

Experimental methods were developed using the integral that allowed the measurement of critical fracture properties in sample sizes that are too small for Linear Elastic Fracture Mechanics (LEFM) to be valid. These experiments allow the determination of fracture toughness from the critical value of fracture energy J_{Ic}, which defines the point at which large-scale plastic yielding during propagation takes place under mode I loading.

The J-integral is equal to the strain energy release rate for a crack in a body subjected to monotonic loading. This is generally true, under quasistatic conditions, only for linear elastic materials. For materials that experience small-scale yielding at the crack tip, J can be used to compute the energy release rate under special circumstances such as monotonic loading in mode III (antiplane shear). The strain energy release rate can also be computed from J for pure power-law hardening plastic materials that undergo small-scale yielding at the crack tip.

The quantity J is not path-independent for monotonic mode I and mode II loading of elastic-plastic materials, so only a contour very close to the crack tip gives the energy release rate. Also, Rice showed that J is path-independent in plastic materials when there is no non-proportional loading. Unloading is a special case of this, but non-proportional plastic loading also invalidates the path-independence. Such non-proportional loading is the reason for the path-dependence for the in-plane loading modes on elastic-plastic materials.

== Two-dimensional J-integral ==
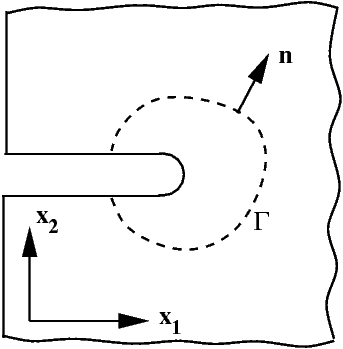
Figure 1. Line J-integral around a notch in two dimensions.

The two-dimensional J-integral was originally defined as (see Figure 1 for an illustration)

$$J := \int_\Gamma \left(W~\mathrm{d}x_2 - \mathbf{t}\cdot\cfrac{\partial\mathbf{u}}{\partial x_1}~\mathrm{d}s\right)
= \int_\Gamma \left(W~\mathrm{d}x_2 - t_i\,\cfrac{\partial u_i}{\partial x_1}~\mathrm{d}s\right)$$

where W(x_{1},x_{2}) is the strain energy density, x_{1},x_{2} are the coordinate directions, t = [σ]n is the surface traction vector, n is the normal to the curve Γ, [σ] is the Cauchy stress tensor, and u is the displacement vector. The strain energy density is given by

$$W = \int_0^{[\varepsilon]} [\boldsymbol{\sigma}]:d[\boldsymbol{\varepsilon}] ~;~~
[\boldsymbol{\varepsilon}] = \tfrac{1}{2}\left[\boldsymbol{\nabla}\mathbf{u}+(\boldsymbol{\nabla}\mathbf{u})^T\right] ~.$$

The J-integral around a crack tip is frequently expressed in a more general form (and in index notation) as

$$J_i := \lim_{\varepsilon\rightarrow 0} \int_{\Gamma_\varepsilon} \left(W(\Gamma) n_i - n_j\sigma_{jk}~\cfrac{\partial u_k(\Gamma, x_i)}{\partial x_i}\right) \, d\Gamma$$

where $J_i$ is the component of the J-integral for crack opening in the $x_i$ direction and $\varepsilon$ is a small region around the crack tip. Using Green's theorem we can show that this integral is zero when the boundary $\Gamma$ is closed and encloses a region that contains no singularities and is simply connected. If the faces of the crack do not have any surface tractions on them then the J-integral is also path independent.

Rice also showed that the value of the J-integral represents the energy release rate for planar crack growth. The J-integral was developed because of the difficulties involved in computing the stress close to a crack in a nonlinear elastic or elastic-plastic material. Rice showed that if monotonic loading was assumed (without any plastic unloading) then the J-integral could be used to compute the energy release rate of plastic materials too.

Proof that the J-integral is zero over a closed path
To show the path independence of the J-integral, we first have to show that the value of $J$ is zero over a closed contour in a simply connected domain. Let us just consider the expression for $J_1$ which is

$$J_1 := \int_\Gamma \left(W n_1 - n_j\sigma_{jk}~\cfrac{\partial u_k}{\partial x_1}\right) \, d\Gamma$$

We can write this as

$$J_1 = \int_\Gamma \left(W \delta_{1j} - \sigma_{jk}~\cfrac{\partial u_k}{\partial x_1}\right)n_j \, d\Gamma$$

From Green's theorem (or the two-dimensional divergence theorem) we have

$$\int_{\Gamma} f_j~n_j~d\Gamma = \int_A \cfrac{\partial f_j}{\partial x_j}~dA$$

Using this result we can express $J_1$ as

$$\begin{align}
J_1 & = \int_A \cfrac{\partial}{\partial x_j}\left(W \delta_{1j} - \sigma_{jk}~\cfrac{\partial u_k}{\partial x_1}\right) dA \\
& = \int_A \left[\cfrac{\partial W}{\partial x_1} -
\cfrac{\partial\sigma_{jk}}{\partial x_j}~\cfrac{\partial u_k}{\partial x_1} -
\sigma_{jk}~\cfrac{\partial^2 u_k}{\partial x_1 \partial x_j}\right]~dA
\end{align}$$

where $A$ is the area enclosed by the contour $\Gamma$. Now, if there are no body forces present, equilibrium (conservation of linear momentum) requires that

$$\boldsymbol{\nabla}\cdot\boldsymbol{\sigma} = \mathbf{0} \qquad \implies \qquad  \cfrac{\partial\sigma_{jk}}{\partial x_j} = 0 ~.$$

Also,

$$[\boldsymbol{\varepsilon}] = \tfrac{1}{2}\left[\boldsymbol{\nabla}\mathbf{u}+(\boldsymbol{\nabla}\mathbf{u})^T\right]
\qquad \implies \qquad
\varepsilon_{jk} = \tfrac{1}{2}\left(\cfrac{\partial u_k}{\partial x_j} + \cfrac{\partial u_j}{\partial x_k}\right) ~.$$

Therefore,

$$\sigma_{jk}\cfrac{\partial\varepsilon_{jk}}{\partial x_1} =
\tfrac{1}{2}\left(\sigma_{jk}\cfrac{\partial^2 u_k}{\partial x_1 \partial x_j} + \sigma_{jk}\cfrac{\partial^2 u_j}{\partial x_1 \partial x_k}\right)$$

From the balance of angular momentum we have $\sigma_{jk} = \sigma_{kj}$. Hence,

$$\sigma_{jk}\cfrac{\partial\varepsilon_{jk}}{\partial x_1} =
\sigma_{jk}\cfrac{\partial^2 u_j}{\partial x_1 \partial x_k}$$

The J-integral may then be written as

$$J_1 = \int_A \left[\cfrac{\partial W}{\partial x_1} -
\sigma_{jk}~\cfrac{\partial\varepsilon_{jk}}{\partial x_1}\right]~dA$$

Now, for an elastic material the stress can be derived from the stored energy function $W$ using

$$\sigma_{jk} = \cfrac{\partial W}{\partial\varepsilon_{jk}}$$

Then, if the elastic modulus tensor is homogeneous, using the chain rule of differentiation,

$$\sigma_{jk}~\cfrac{\partial\varepsilon_{jk}}{\partial x_1} = \cfrac{\partial W}{\partial\varepsilon_{jk}}~\cfrac{\partial\varepsilon_{jk}}{\partial x_1} = \cfrac{\partial W}{\partial x_1}$$

Therefore, we have $J_1 = 0$ for a closed contour enclosing a simply connected region without any elastic inhomogeneity, such as voids and cracks.

Proof that the J-integral is path-independent

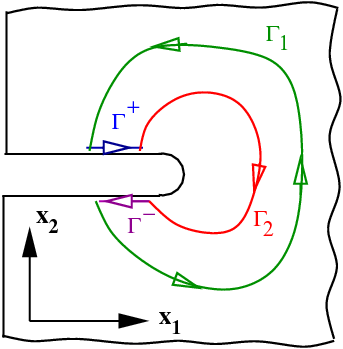
Figure 2. Integration paths around a notch in two dimensions.

Consider the contour $\Gamma = \Gamma_1 + \Gamma^{+} + \Gamma_2 + \Gamma^{-}$. Since this contour is closed and encloses a simply connected region, the J-integral around the contour is zero, i.e.

$$J = J_{(1)} + J^{+} - J_{(2)} - J^{-} = 0$$

assuming that counterclockwise integrals around the crack tip have positive sign. Now, since the crack surfaces are parallel to the $x_1$ axis, the normal component $n_1 = 0$ on these surfaces. Also, since the crack surfaces are traction free, $t_k = 0$. Therefore,

$$J^{+} = J^{-} = \int_{\Gamma} \left(W n_1 - t_k~\cfrac{\partial u_k}{\partial x_1}\right) \, d\Gamma = 0$$

Therefore,

$$J_{(1)} = J_{(2)}$$

and the J-integral is path independent.

== J-integral and fracture toughness ==
For isotropic, perfectly brittle, linear elastic materials, the J-integral can be directly related to the fracture toughness if the crack extends straight ahead with respect to its original orientation.

For plane strain, under Mode I loading conditions, this relation is

$$J_{\rm Ic} = G_{\rm Ic} = K_{\rm Ic}^2 \left(\frac{1-\nu^2}{E}\right)$$

where $G_{\rm Ic}$ is the critical strain energy release rate, $K_{\rm Ic}$ is the fracture toughness in Mode I loading, $\nu$ is the Poisson's ratio, and E is the Young's modulus of the material.

For Mode II loading, the relation between the J-integral and the mode II fracture toughness ($K_{\rm IIc}$) is

$$J_{\rm IIc} = G_{\rm IIc} = K_{\rm IIc}^2 \left[\frac{1-\nu^2}{E}\right]$$

For Mode III loading, the relation is

$$J_{\rm IIIc} = G_{\rm IIIc} = K_{\rm IIIc}^2 \left(\frac{1+\nu}{E}\right)$$

== Elastic-plastic materials and the HRR solution ==
Paths for J-integral calculation around a crack in a two-dimensional elastic-plastic material.

Hutchinson, Rice and Rosengren subsequently showed that J characterizes the singular stress and strain fields at the tip of a crack in nonlinear (power law hardening) elastic-plastic materials where the size of the plastic zone is small compared with the crack length. Hutchinson used a material constitutive law of the form suggested by W. Ramberg and W. Osgood:

$$\frac{\varepsilon}{\varepsilon_y}=\frac{\sigma}{\sigma_y}+\alpha\left(\frac{\sigma}{\sigma_y}\right)^n$$

where σ is the stress in uniaxial tension, σ_{y} is a yield stress, ε is the strain, and ε_{y} = σ_{y}/E is the corresponding yield strain. The quantity E is the elastic Young's modulus of the material. The model is parametrized by α, a dimensionless constant characteristic of the material, and n, the coefficient of work hardening. This model is applicable only to situations where the stress increases monotonically, the stress components remain approximately in the same ratios as loading progresses (proportional loading), and there is no unloading.

If a far-field tensile stress σ_{far} is applied to the body shown in the adjacent figure, the J-integral around the path Γ_{1} (chosen to be completely inside the elastic zone) is given by

$$J_{\Gamma_1} = \pi\,(\sigma_{\text{far}})^2 \,.$$

Since the total integral around the crack vanishes and the contributions along the surface of the crack are zero, we have

$$J_{\Gamma_1} = -J_{\Gamma_2} \,.$$

If the path Γ_{2} is chosen such that it is inside the fully plastic domain, Hutchinson showed that

$$J_{\Gamma_2} = -\alpha\,K^{n+1}\,r^{(n+1)(s-2)+1}\,I$$

where K is a stress amplitude, (r,θ) is a polar coordinate system with origin at the crack tip, s is a constant determined from an asymptotic expansion of the stress field around the crack, and I is a dimensionless integral. The relation between the J-integrals around Γ_{1} and Γ_{2} leads to the constraint

$$s = \frac{2n+1}{n+1}$$

and an expression for K in terms of the far-field stress

$$K = \left(\frac{\beta\,\pi}{\alpha\,I}\right)^{\frac{1}{n+1}}\,(\sigma_{\text{far}})^{\frac{2}{n+1}}$$

where β = 1 for plane stress and β = 1 − ν^{2} for plane strain (ν is the Poisson's ratio).

The asymptotic expansion of the stress field and the above ideas can be used to determine the stress and strain fields in terms of the J-integral:

$$\sigma_{ij}= \sigma_y \left (\frac{EJ}{r\,\alpha \sigma_y^2 I} \right )^{{1}\over{n+1}}\tilde{\sigma}_{ij}(n,\theta)$$
$$\varepsilon_{ij}=\frac{\alpha \varepsilon_y}{E} \left (\frac{EJ}{r\,\alpha \sigma_y^2 I} \right )^{{n}\over{n+1}}\tilde{\varepsilon}_{ij}(n,\theta)$$

where $\tilde{\sigma}_{ij}$ and $\tilde{\varepsilon}_{ij}$ are dimensionless functions.

These expressions indicate that J can be interpreted as a plastic analog to the stress intensity factor (K) that is used in linear elastic fracture mechanics, i.e., we can use a criterion such as J > J_{Ic} as a crack growth criterion.

== See also ==
- Fracture toughness
- Toughness
- Fracture mechanics
- Stress intensity factor
- Nature of the slip band local field
