= Schmid's law =

Formula for the direction of slip of a stressed crystalline material

In materials science, Schmid's law (also Schmid factor (Note: German: Schmid'sches Schubspannungsgesetz, lit. 'Schmid's shear-stress-law', and Schmid-Faktor or Schmid'scher Orientierungsfaktor, 'Schmid's orientation factor'.)) states that slip begins in a crystalline material when the resolved shear stress on a slip system reaches a critical value, known as the critical resolved shear stress.

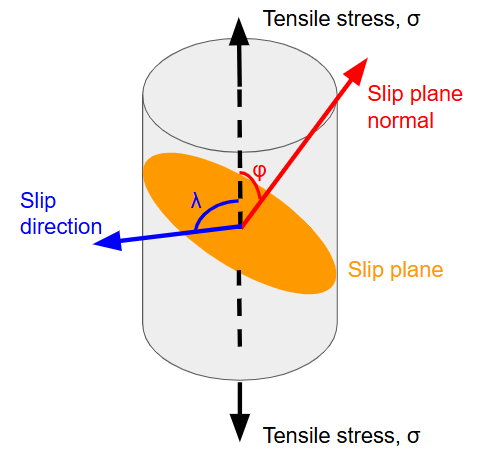
Schematic of vectors and angles used to calculate the Schmid factor for a slip system

A slip system can be described by two vectors: a vector normal to the slip plane and a vector parallel to the slip direction. The resolved shear stress on a slip system ($\tau$) is given by

$\tau = \sigma \cos\phi \cos\lambda$,

where $\sigma$ is the magnitude of the applied tensile stress, $\phi$ is the angle between the slip plane normal and the direction of the applied stress, and $\lambda$ is the angle between the slip direction and the direction of the applied stress. This equation can also be expressed in terms of the Schmid factor ($m$), given by

$m = \cos\phi \cos\lambda$

According to Schmid's law, slip begins on the slip system when $\tau = \tau_c$, where $\tau_c$ is the critical resolved shear stress. The corresponding tensile stress at which slip begins is the yield stress ($\sigma_y$), which is related to the critical resolved shear stress by

$\tau_c = m \sigma_y$.

The Schmid factor is limited to the range $0 \le m \le 0.5$. The Schmid factor is minimized when the tensile stress is perpendicular to the slip plane normal ($\cos\phi = 0$) or perpendicular to the slip direction ($\cos \lambda = 0$). The Schmid factor is maximized when $\phi = \lambda = 45^\circ$. For crystals with multiple slip systems, Schmid's law indicates that the slip system with the largest Schmid factor will yield first.

The Schmid factor is named after Erich Schmid who coauthored a book with Walter Boas introducing the concept in 1935.

== See also ==
- Critical resolved shear stress
