= Bruce Bilby =

English mechanical engineer (1922–2013)

- Born: Bruce Alexander Bilby; 3 September 1922
- Died: 20 November 2013 (aged 91)
- Awards: FRS
- Scientific career
- Institutions: University of Sheffield; University of Birmingham

Bruce Alexander Bilby FRS (3 September 1922 – 20 November 2013) was a British mechanical engineer, and an Emeritus Professor at the University of Sheffield.

== Life ==
He was a graduate of Dover Grammar School for Boys.

He once taught at University of Birmingham and was the Professor of the Theory of Materials at the University of Sheffield from 1966 to 1984. He was a colleague of Alan Cottrell.

He died aged 91 on 20 November 2013.

== See also ==
- Cottrell atmosphere
- Flow plasticity theory
