= Cottrell atmosphere =

Concept in materials science

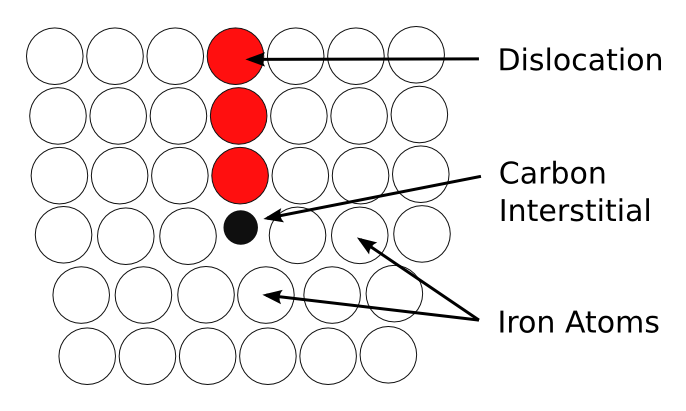
A carbon atom below a dislocation in iron, forming a Cottrell atmosphere

In materials science, the concept of the Cottrell atmosphere was introduced by A. H. Cottrell and B. A. Bilby in 1949 to explain how dislocations are pinned in some metals by boron, carbon, or nitrogen interstitials.

Cottrell atmospheres occur in body-centered cubic (BCC) and face-centered cubic (FCC) materials, such as iron or nickel, with small impurity atoms, such as boron, carbon, or nitrogen. As these interstitial atoms distort the lattice slightly, there will be an associated residual stress field surrounding the interstitial. This stress field can be relaxed by the interstitial atom diffusing towards a dislocation, which contains a small gap at its core (as it is a more open structure). Once the atom has diffused into the dislocation core, the atom will stay and the dislocation can be considered pinned. Typically only one interstitial atom is required per lattice plane of the dislocation for there to be a Cottrell atmosphere. The collection of solute atoms around the dislocation core due to this process is the Cottrell atmosphere.

== Influence on Mechanical Behavior ==
A dislocation moving with a Cottrell Atmosphere around it. At high stresses (top), the dislocation can "break free" of the atmosphere, while at low stresses (bottom), the dislocation must drag the solutes with it, and motion is much slower.

The collection of solute atoms at the dislocation relieves the stresses associated with the dislocation, which lowers the energy of the dislocation's presence. Thus, moving the dislocation out of this Cottrell atmosphere constitutes an increase in energy, so it is not favorable for the dislocation to move forward in the crystal. As a result, the dislocation is effectively pinned by the Cottrell atmosphere.

Once a dislocation has become pinned, a large force is required to unpin the dislocation prior the yielding, thus at room temperature, the dislocation will not get unpinned. This produces an observed upper yield point in a stress–strain graph. Beyond the upper yield point, the pinned dislocation will act as Frank–Read source to generate new dislocations that are not pinned. These dislocations are free to move in the crystal, which results in a subsequent lower yield point, and the material will deform in a more plastic manner.

Leaving the sample to age, by holding it at room temperature for a few hours, enables the carbon atoms to rediffuse back to dislocation cores, resulting in a return of the upper yield point.

Cottrell atmospheres lead to formation of Lüders bands and large forces for deep drawing and forming large sheets, making them a hindrance to manufacture. Some steels are designed to remove the Cottrell atmosphere effect by removing all the interstitial atoms. Steels such as interstitial free steel are decarburized and small quantities of titanium are added to remove nitrogen.

The Cottrell atmosphere also has important consequences for material behavior at high homologous temperatures, i.e. when the material is experiencing creep conditions. Moving a dislocation with an associated Cottrell atmosphere introduces viscous drag, an effective frictional force that makes moving the dislocation more difficult (and thus slowing plastic deformation). This drag force can be expressed according to the equation:

$F_{drag} = \frac{kT\Omega}{vD_{sol}} \int \frac{J\centerdot J}{c}dA$,

where $D_{sol}$ is the diffusivity of the solute atom in the host material, $\Omega$ is the atomic volume, $v$ is the velocity of the dislocation, $J$ is the diffusion flux density, and $c$ is the solute concentration. The existence of the Cottrell atmosphere and the effects of viscous drag have been proven to be important in high temperature deformation at intermediate stresses, as well as contributing to the power-law breakdown regime.

== Similar phenomena ==
While the Cottrell atmosphere is a general effect, there are additional related mechanisms that occur under more specialized circumstances.

=== Suzuki effect ===
The Suzuki effect is characterized by the segregation of solutes to stacking fault defects. When dislocations in an FCC system split into two partial dislocations, a hexagonal close-packed (HCP) stacking fault is formed between the two partials. H. Suzuki predicted that the concentration of solute atoms at this boundary would differ from the bulk. Moving through this field of solute atoms would therefore produce a similar drag on dislocations as the Cottrell atmosphere. Suzuki later observed such segregation in 1961. The Suzuki effect is often associated with adsorption of substitutional solute atoms to the stacking fault, but it has also been found to occur with interstitial atoms diffusing out of the stacking fault.

Once two partial dislocations have split, they cannot cross-slip around obstacles anymore. Just as the Cottrell atmosphere provided a force against dislocation motion, the Suzuki effect in the stacking fault will lead to increased stresses for recombination of partials, leading to increased difficulty in bypassing obstacles (such as precipitates or particles), and therefore resulting in a stronger material.

=== Snoek effect ===
Under an applied stress, interstitial solute atoms, such as carbon and nitrogen can migrate within the α-Fe lattice, a BCC metal. These short-range migrations of carbon and nitrogen solute atoms result in an internal friction or an elastic effect, called the Snoek effect. The Snoek effect was discovered by J. L. Snoek in 1941. At room temperature, the solubility of carbon and nitrogen in solid solutions is exceedingly small. By raising the temperature beyond 400 °C and cooling at a moderate rate, it is easy to keep a few hundredths of a percent of either element within the solution, while the remainder is supersaturated. This revelation led to observed special magnetic phenomena in iron, mainly the presence of magnetism and time decrease of permeability due to small amount of carbon and nitrogen remaining in the iron. Moreover, the additional presence of magnetism leads to an elastic-after effect.

By preparing samples containing a larger amount of carbon or nitrogen in solid solution, magnetic and elastic phenomena are greatly enhanced. The solubility of nitrogen is much larger than the solubility of carbon in solid solution. The study of the Snoek effect on annealed irons provides a reliable mechanism for calculating the solubility of carbon and nitrogen in α-iron. A sample in a mixture of hydrogen and ammonia (or carbon monoxide) is mixed and heated until a stationary state was reached, where the mass of carbon and nitrogen taken up during the process can be found by estimating the changes in the weight of the sample.

Carbon and nitrogen atoms occupy octahedral interstices at the midpoints of the cube edges and at the centers of the cube faces. If a stress is applied a long the z, or [001] direction, the octahedral interstices along the x- and y-axes will contract, while the octahedral interstices along the z-direction expand. Eventually, the interstitial atoms move to sites along the z-axis. When the interstitial atoms move, this leads to a reduction in strain energy. In BCC metals, interstitial sites of an unstrained lattice are equally favorable. The interstitial solutes create elastic dipoles. However, once a strain is applied on the lattice, such as that formed by a dislocation, 1/3 of the sites become more favorable than the other 2/3. Solute atoms will therefore move to occupy the favorable sites, forming a short ranged order of solutes immediately within the vicinity of the dislocation. The motion of the interstitial solutes to these other sites constitutes a change in the elastic dipoles, so there is a relaxation time associated with this change which can be connected to the diffusivity and migration enthalpy of the solute atoms. In the new, relaxed solute configuration, more energy is therefore required to break a dislocation from this order.

However, a stress applied in the [111] direction will not lead to any changes in the locations of the interstitial atoms as the three directions of the cube will be equally stressed, and on average, equally occupied by carbon atoms. When a stress is applied along a cube edge and at an amount below the yield stress, the interstitial atom will lead to strain lagging before stress, showing the presence of internal friction. A torsional pendulum is typically used as a means of studying this lagging effect. The angle of lag is taken to be δ and tan δ is considered a measure of internal friction. The internal friction is expressed according to the equation:

$\tan(\delta) = \left ( \frac{\log(decrement)}{\pi} \right ) = Q^{-1}$

Where the logarithmic decrement is the ratio of consecutive magnitudes of one cycle of the pendulum. When the magnitude of one cycle decreases to $\frac{1}{n}$ of its original value in time $t$, then the internal fraction behaves according to the equation:

$\tan(\delta)=Q^{-1}=\frac{\ln\frac{1}{n}}{\pi \times v \times t}$

Where $v$ is the vibrational frequency of the pendulum.

The interstitials that occupy the normal sites in an unstressed lattice will promote internal friction. Substituted solute atoms and interstitials in strain fields of a dislocation or at grain boundaries have their internal friction changed. Therefore, the Snoek effect can measure carbon and nitrogen concentration in BCC alpha-Fe and other solutes present in ternary alloys.

== Materials ==
Materials in which dislocations described by Cottrell atmosphere include metals and semiconductor materials such silicon crystals.
