= Configurational mechanics =

Configurational mechanics is a subdiscipline of continuum mechanics in which particular emphasis is placed on reckoning from the perspective of the material manifold. By contrast, in classical mechanics, reckoning is commonly made from the perspective of spatial coordinates.

Configurational mechanics has been applied to the analysis of crack growth. In these applications, growth of the crack corresponds to a material displacement, and the configurational force causing crack growth emerges as the Energy release rate.
