= Flow plasticity theory =

Solid mechanics theory

Plastic deformation of a thin metal sheet.

Flow plasticity is a solid mechanics theory that is used to describe the plastic behavior of materials. Flow plasticity theories are characterized by the assumption that a flow rule exists that can be used to determine the amount of plastic deformation in the material.

In flow plasticity theories it is assumed that the total strain in a body can be decomposed additively (or multiplicatively) into an elastic part and a plastic part. The elastic part of the strain can be computed from a linear elastic or hyperelastic constitutive model. However, determination of the plastic part of the strain requires a flow rule and a hardening model.

== Small deformation theory ==
Stress-strain curve showing typical plastic behavior of materials in uniaxial compression. The strain can be decomposed into a recoverable elastic strain ($\varepsilon_e$) and an inelastic strain ($\varepsilon_p$). The stress at initial yield is $\sigma_0$. For strain hardening materials (as shown in the figure) the yield stress increases with increasing plastic deformation to a value of $\sigma_y$.

Typical flow plasticity theories for unidirectional loading (for small deformation perfect plasticity or hardening plasticity) are developed on the basis of the following requirements:

1. The material has a linear elastic range.
2. The material has an elastic limit defined as the stress at which plastic deformation first takes place, i.e., $\sigma = \sigma_0$.
3. Beyond the elastic limit the stress state always remains on the yield surface, i.e., $\sigma = \sigma_y$.
4. Loading is defined as the situation under which increments of stress are greater than zero, i.e., $d\sigma > 0$. If loading takes the stress state to the plastic domain then the increment of plastic strain is always greater than zero, i.e., $d\varepsilon_p > 0$.
5. Unloading is defined as the situation under which increments of stress are less than zero, i.e., $d\sigma < 0$. The material is elastic during unloading and no additional plastic strain is accumulated.
6. The total strain is a linear combination of the elastic and plastic parts, i.e., $d\varepsilon = d\varepsilon_e + d\varepsilon_p$. The plastic part cannot be recovered while the elastic part is fully recoverable.
7. The work done of a loading-unloading cycle is positive or zero, i.e., $d\sigma\,d\varepsilon = d\sigma\,(d\varepsilon_e + d\varepsilon_p) \ge 0$. This is also called the Drucker stability postulate and eliminates the possibility of strain softening behavior.

The above requirements can be expressed in three dimensional states of stress and multidirectional loading as follows.

- Elasticity (Hooke's law). In the linear elastic regime the stresses and strains in the material are related by

$$\boldsymbol{\sigma} = \mathsf{D}:\boldsymbol{\varepsilon}$$
where the stiffness matrix $\mathsf{D}$ is constant.

- Elastic limit (Yield surface). The elastic limit is defined by a yield surface that does not depend on the plastic strain and has the form

$$f(\boldsymbol{\sigma}) = 0 \,.$$

- Beyond the elastic limit. For strain hardening materials, the yield surface evolves with increasing plastic strain and the elastic limit changes. The evolving yield surface has the form

$$f(\boldsymbol{\sigma}, \boldsymbol{\varepsilon}_p) = 0 \,.$$

- Loading. For general states of stress, plastic loading is indicated if the state of stress is on the yield surface and the stress increment is directed toward the outside of the yield surface; this occurs if the inner product of the stress increment and the outward normal of the yield surface is positive, i.e.,

$$d\boldsymbol{\sigma}:\frac{\partial f}{\partial \boldsymbol{\sigma}} \ge 0 \,.$$
The above equation, when it is equal to zero, indicates a state of neutral loading where the stress state moves along the yield surface.

- Unloading: A similar argument is made for unloading for which situation $f < 0$, the material is in the elastic domain, and

$$d\boldsymbol{\sigma}:\frac{\partial f}{\partial \boldsymbol{\sigma}} < 0 \,.$$

- Strain decomposition: The additive decomposition of the strain into elastic and plastic parts can be written as

$$d\boldsymbol{\varepsilon} = d\boldsymbol{\varepsilon}_e + d\boldsymbol{\varepsilon}_p \,.$$

- Stability postulate: The stability postulate is expressed as

$$d\boldsymbol{\sigma}:d\boldsymbol{\varepsilon} \ge 0 \,.$$

=== Flow rule ===
In metal plasticity, the assumption that the plastic strain increment and deviatoric stress tensor have the same principal directions is encapsulated in a relation called the flow rule. Rock plasticity theories also use a similar concept except that the requirement of pressure-dependence of the yield surface requires a relaxation of the above assumption. Instead, it is typically assumed that the plastic strain increment and the normal to the pressure-dependent yield surface have the same direction, i.e.,

$$d\boldsymbol{\varepsilon}_p = d\lambda\,\frac{\partial f}{\partial \boldsymbol{\sigma}}$$

where $d\lambda > 0$ is a hardening parameter. This form of the flow rule is called an associated flow rule and the assumption of co-directionality is called the normality condition. The function $f$ is also called a plastic potential.

The above flow rule is easily justified for perfectly plastic deformations for which $d\boldsymbol{\sigma} = 0$ when $d\boldsymbol{\varepsilon}_p > 0$, i.e., the yield surface remains constant under increasing plastic deformation. This implies that the increment of elastic strain is also zero, $d\boldsymbol{\varepsilon}_e = 0$, because of Hooke's law. Therefore,

$$d\boldsymbol{\sigma}:\frac{\partial f}{\partial \boldsymbol{\sigma}} = 0 \quad \text{and} \quad d\boldsymbol{\sigma}:d\boldsymbol{\varepsilon}_p = 0 \,.$$

Hence, both the normal to the yield surface and the plastic strain tensor are perpendicular to the stress tensor and must have the same direction.

For a work hardening material, the yield surface can expand with increasing stress. We assume Drucker's second stability postulate which states that for an infinitesimal stress cycle this plastic work is positive, i.e.,

$$d\boldsymbol{\sigma}: d\boldsymbol{\varepsilon}_p \ge 0 \,.$$

The above quantity is equal to zero for purely elastic cycles. Examination of the work done over a cycle of plastic loading-unloading can be used to justify the validity of the associated flow rule.

=== Consistency condition ===
The Prager consistency condition is needed to close the set of constitutive equations and to eliminate the unknown parameter $d\lambda$ from the system of equations. The consistency condition states that $df = 0$ at yield because $f(\boldsymbol{\sigma},\boldsymbol{\varepsilon}_p) = 0$, and hence

$$df = \frac{\partial f}{\partial \boldsymbol{\sigma}}:d\boldsymbol{\sigma} + \frac{\partial f}{\partial \boldsymbol{\varepsilon}_p}:d\boldsymbol{\varepsilon}_p = 0 \,.$$

== Large deformation theory ==
Large deformation flow theories of plasticity typically start with one of the following assumptions:

- the rate of deformation tensor can be additively decomposed into an elastic part and a plastic part, or
- the deformation gradient tensor can be multiplicatively decomposed in an elastic part and a plastic part.

The first assumption was widely used for numerical simulations of metals but has gradually been superseded by the multiplicative theory.

=== Kinematics of multiplicative plasticity ===
The concept of multiplicative decomposition of the deformation gradient into elastic and plastic parts was first proposed independently by B. A. Bilby, E. Kröner, in the context of crystal plasticity and extended to continuum plasticity by Erasmus Lee. The decomposition assumes that the total deformation gradient (F) can be decomposed as:

$$\boldsymbol{F} = \boldsymbol{F}^e\cdot\boldsymbol{F}^p$$

where F^{e} is the elastic (recoverable) part and F^{p} is the plastic (unrecoverable) part of the deformation. The spatial velocity gradient is given by

$$\begin{align}
\boldsymbol{l} & = \dot{\boldsymbol{F}}\cdot\boldsymbol{F}^{-1}
= \left(\dot{\boldsymbol{F}}^e\cdot\boldsymbol{F}^p + \boldsymbol{F}^e\cdot\dot{\boldsymbol{F}}^p\right)\cdot
\left[(\boldsymbol{F}^p)^{-1}\cdot(\boldsymbol{F}^e)^{-1}\right] \\
& = \dot{\boldsymbol{F}}^e\cdot(\boldsymbol{F}^e)^{-1} + \boldsymbol{F}^e\cdot[\dot{\boldsymbol{F}}^p\cdot
(\boldsymbol{F}^p)^{-1}]\cdot(\boldsymbol{F}^e)^{-1} \,.
\end{align}$$

where a superposed dot indicates a time derivative. We can write the above as

$$\boldsymbol{l} = \boldsymbol{l}^e + \boldsymbol{F}^e\cdot\boldsymbol{L}^p\cdot(\boldsymbol{F}^e)^{-1} \,.$$

The quantity

$$\boldsymbol{L}^p := \dot{\boldsymbol{F}}^p\cdot
(\boldsymbol{F}^p)^{-1}$$

is called a plastic velocity gradient and is defined in an intermediate (incompatible) stress-free configuration. The symmetric part (D^{p}) of L^{p} is called the plastic rate of deformation while the skew-symmetric part (W^{p}) is called the plastic spin:

$$\boldsymbol{D}^p = \tfrac{1}{2}[\boldsymbol{L}^p +(\boldsymbol{L}^p)^T] ~,~~
\boldsymbol{W}^p = \tfrac{1}{2}[\boldsymbol{L}^p -(\boldsymbol{L}^p)^T] \,.$$

Typically, the plastic spin is ignored in most descriptions of finite plasticity.

=== Elastic regime ===
The elastic behavior in the finite strain regime is typically described by a hyperelastic material model. The elastic strain can be measured using an elastic right Cauchy-Green deformation tensor defined as:

$$\boldsymbol{C}^e := (\boldsymbol{F}^e)^T\cdot\boldsymbol{F}^e \,.$$

The logarithmic or Hencky strain tensor may then be defined as

$$\boldsymbol{E}^e := \tfrac{1}{2}\ln\boldsymbol{C}^e \,.$$

The symmetrized Mandel stress tensor is a convenient stress measure for finite plasticity and is defined as

$$\boldsymbol{M} := \tfrac{1}{2}(\boldsymbol{C}^e\cdot\boldsymbol{S} + \boldsymbol{S}\cdot\boldsymbol{C}^e)$$

where S is the second Piola-Kirchhoff stress. A possible hyperelastic model in terms of the logarithmic strain is

$$\boldsymbol{M} = \frac{\partial W}{\partial \boldsymbol{E}^e} = J\,\frac{dU}{dJ} + 2\mu\,\text{dev}(\boldsymbol{E}^e)$$

where W is a strain energy density function, J = det(F), μ is a modulus, and "dev" indicates the deviatoric part of a tensor.

=== Flow rule ===
Application of the Clausius-Duhem inequality leads, in the absence of a plastic spin, to the finite strain flow rule

$$\boldsymbol{D}^p = \dot{\lambda}\,\frac{\partial f}{\partial \boldsymbol{M}} \,.$$

=== Loading-unloading conditions ===
The loading-unloading conditions can be shown to be equivalent to the Karush-Kuhn-Tucker conditions

$$\dot{\lambda} \ge 0 ~,~~ f \le 0~,~~ \dot{\lambda}\,f = 0 \,.$$

=== Consistency condition ===
The consistency condition is identical to that for the small strain case,

$$\dot{\lambda}\,\dot{f} = 0 \,.$$

== See also ==
- Plasticity (physics)
