= Frank–Read source =

Model for the generation of specific dislocations in crystals under deformation

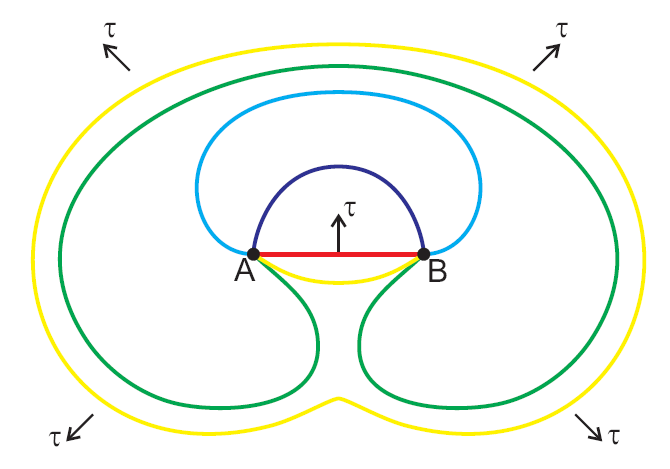
A Frank–Read source consists of a dislocation pinned at two points A and B and subjected to a shear stress. The pinned dislocation expands and wraps around repeatedly forming new dislocation loops.

In materials science, a Frank–Read source is a mechanism explaining the generation of multiple dislocations in specific well-spaced slip planes in crystals when they are deformed. When a crystal is deformed, in order for slip to occur, dislocations must be generated in the material. This implies that, during deformation, dislocations must be primarily generated in these planes. Cold working of metal increases the number of dislocations by the Frank–Read mechanism. Higher dislocation density increases yield strength and causes work hardening of metals.

The mechanism of dislocation generation was proposed by and named after British physicist Charles Frank and Thornton Read.

In 2024, Cheng Long and coworkers demonstrated that the Frank-Read mechanism can generate disclination loops in nematic liquid crystals. This finding suggests that the Frank-Read mechanism may arise in a broader class of materials containing topological defect lines.

== History ==
Charles Frank detailed the history of the discovery from his perspective in Proceedings of the Royal Society in 1980.

In 1950 Charles Frank, who was then a research fellow in the physics department at the University of Bristol, visited the United States to participate in a conference on crystal plasticity in Pittsburgh. Frank arrived in the United States well in advance of the conference to spend time at a naval laboratory and to give a lecture at Cornell University. When, during his travels in Pennsylvania, Frank visited Pittsburgh, he received a letter from fellow scientist Jock Eshelby suggesting that he read a recent paper by Gunther Leibfried. Frank was supposed to board a train to Cornell to give his lecture at Cornell, but before departing for Cornell he went to the library at Carnegie Institute of Technology to obtain a copy of the paper. The library did not yet have the journal with Leibfried's paper, but the staff at the library believed that the journal could be in the recently arrived package from Germany. Frank decided to wait for the library to open the package, which did indeed contain the journal. Upon reading the paper he took a train to Cornell, where he was told to pass the time until 5:00, as the faculty was in meeting. Frank decided to take a walk between 3:00 and 5:00. During those two hours, while considering the Leibfried paper, he formulated the theory for what was later named the Frank–Read source.

A couple of days later, he traveled to the conference on crystal plasticity in Pittsburgh where he ran into Thornton Read in the hotel lobby. Upon encountering each other, the two scientists immediately discovered that they had come up with the same idea for dislocation generation almost simultaneously (Frank during his walk at Cornell, and Thornton Read during tea the previous Wednesday) and decided to write a joint paper on the topic. The mechanism for dislocation generation described in that paper is now known as the Frank–Read source.

== Mechanism ==
Animation illustrating how stress on a Frank–Read source (center) can generate multiple dislocation lines in a crystal.

The Frank–Read source is a mechanism based on dislocation multiplication in a slip plane under shear stress.

Consider a straight dislocation in a crystal slip plane with its two ends, A and B, pinned. If a shear stress $\tau$ is exerted on the slip plane then a force $F=\tau \cdot bx$, where b is the Burgers vector of the dislocation and x is the distance between the pinning sites A and B, is exerted on the dislocation line as a result of the shear stress. This force acts perpendicularly to the line, inducing the dislocation to lengthen and curve into an arc.

The bending force caused by the shear stress is opposed by the line tension of the dislocation, which acts on each end of the dislocation along the direction of the dislocation line away from A and B with a magnitude of $Gb^2$, where G is the shear modulus. If the dislocation bends, the ends of the dislocation make an angle with the horizontal between A and B, which gives the line tensions acting along the ends a vertical component acting directly against the force induced by the shear stress. If sufficient shear stress is applied and the dislocation bends, the vertical component from the line tensions, which acts directly against the force caused by the shear stress, grows as the dislocation approaches a semicircular shape.

When the dislocation becomes a semicircle, all of the line tension is acting against the bending force induced by the shear stress, because the line tension is perpendicular to the horizontal between A and B. For the dislocation to reach this point, it is thus evident that the equation:

$$F=\tau \cdot bx =2Gb^2$$

must be satisfied, and from this we can solve for the shear stress:

$$\tau=\frac{2Gb} x$$

This is the stress required to generate dislocation from a Frank–Read source. If the shear stress increases any further and the dislocation passes the semicircular equilibrium state, it will spontaneously continue to bend and grow, spiraling around the A and B pinning points, until the segments spiraling around the A and B pinning points collide and cancel. The process results in a dislocation loop around A and B in the slip plane which expands under continued shear stress, and also in a new dislocation line between A and B which, under renewed or continued shear, can continue to generate dislocation loops in the manner just described.

A Frank–Read loop can thus generate many dislocations in a plane in a crystal under applied stress. The Frank–Read source mechanism explains why dislocations are primarily generated on certain slip planes; dislocations are primarily generated in just those planes with Frank–Read sources. If the shear stress does not exceed:

$$\tau=\frac{2Gb} x$$

and the dislocation does not bend past the semicircular equilibrium state, it will not form a dislocation loop and instead revert to its original state.
