= James R. Rice =

American scientist in engineering of solid mechanics

James R. Rice ForMemRS
- Born: December 3, 1940 (age 85)
- Education: B.S. (Engineering Mechanics), Lehigh University, 1962; M.S. (Applied Mechanics), Lehigh University, 1963; Ph.D. (Applied Mechanics), Lehigh University, 1964
- Awards: Timoshenko Medal (1994); Francis J. Clamer Medal (1996); Maurice A. Biot Medal (2007); Panetti-Ferrari International Prize (2008); Walter H. Bucher Medal (2012); Harvey Prize (2021)
- Scientific career
- Fields: Materials and Mechanical Engineering, Geophysics
- Workplaces: Brown University; Harvard University
- Doctoral students: Huajian Gao; Karen Felzer; Nadia Lapusta

James Robert Rice (born December 3, 1940) is an American engineer, scientist, geophysicist, and Mallinckrodt Professor of Engineering Sciences and Geophysics at the Harvard John A. Paulson School of Engineering and Applied Sciences.

Rice is known as a mechanician, who has made fundamental contributions to various aspects of solid mechanics. Two of his early contributions are the concept of the J-integral in fracture mechanics and an explanation of how plastic deformations localize in a narrow band. In recent years, Rice has focused on the mechanical processes involved in earthquakes.

== Biography ==
=== Youth and early career ===
Rice was born in 1940 in Frederick, Maryland, son of Donald Blessing Rice and Mary Celia (Santangelo) Rice. He received his B.S. in Engineering Mechanics from Lehigh University in 1962. He went on to receive his M.S. and Ph.D. in Applied Mechanics from Lehigh in 1963 and 1964, respectively.

Rice taught at Brown University from 1964 until 1981, when he accepted a position at Harvard University. By the time he started to publish his first major, high-cited, publications in 1967–68, he was assistant professor of engineering at Brown University. A seminal contribution was the below-listed paper in Philosophical Magazine with Robb Thomson of the National Bureau of Standards (now NIST) on the critical conditions for the emission of dislocations from crack tips, and thus the criterion for blunting versus propagation of a brittle crack.

=== Further career and recognition ===
Since 1981 Rice teaches at Harvard University. Since 2001, he has served as the Mallinckrodt Professor of Engineering Sciences and Geophysics in the Harvard School of Engineering and Applied Sciences.

In 1994, he received the Timoshenko Medal "for seminal contributions to the understanding of plasticity and fracture of engineering materials and applications in the development in the computational and experimental methods of broad significance in mechanical engineering practice". He was also awarded The Franklin Institute's Francis J. Clamer Medal in 1996. In 2008, he was awarded the Panetti-Ferrari International Prize for Applied Mechanics. In 2016 the ASME awarded him the ASME Medal. In 2021 he received the Harvey Prize of the Technion in Israel.

Rice was elected a member of the National Academy of Engineering in 1980 for providing a sound and practical basis for the needed rapid development of inelastic fracture mechanics. He was also elected a member of the National Academy of Sciences in 1981. In March 1996 he was elected as a Foreign member of the Royal Society. In 2015, the Society of Engineering Science established the James R. Rice Medal to honor Rice's contributions to the engineering sciences.

== Selected publications ==
- Rice, James R. A path independent integral and the approximate analysis of strain concentration by notches and cracks. Department of Defense Advanced Research Projects Agency. Contract SD-86, Material Research Program, May 1967.
- Rice, James R. "Mathematical analysis in the mechanics of fracture." Fracture: an advanced treatise 2 (1968): 191–311.
- Rice, James R. "Inelastic constitutive relations for solids: an internal-variable theory and its application to metal plasticity." Journal of the Mechanics and Physics of Solids 19.6 (1971): 433–455.
- Rice, J. R.; Thomson, R (May 1, 1973). "Ductile vs brittle behavior of crystals". Philosophical Magazine: 73–97. doi:10.2172/4403224. OSTI 4403224.
- Rice, James R., and Michael P. Cleary. "Some basic stress diffusion solutions for fluid‐saturated elastic porous media with compressible constituents." Reviews of Geophysics 14.2 (1976): 227–241.
- Rice, James R. "The localization of plastic deformation." (1976): 207.
