= Antiplane shear =

Antiplane shear or antiplane strain is a special state of strain in a body. This state of strain is achieved when the displacements in the body are zero in the plane of interest but nonzero in the direction perpendicular to the plane. For small strains, the strain tensor under antiplane shear can be written as

$$\boldsymbol{\varepsilon} = \begin{bmatrix}
0 & 0 & \epsilon_{13} \\
0 & 0 & \epsilon_{23}\\
\epsilon_{13}    &    \epsilon_{23}      & 0\end{bmatrix}$$

where the $12\,$ plane is the plane of interest and the $3\,$ direction is perpendicular to that plane.

== Displacements ==
The displacement field that leads to a state of antiplane shear is (in rectangular Cartesian coordinates)

$$u_1 = u_2 = 0 ~;~~ u_3 = \hat{u}_3(x_1, x_2)$$

where $u_i,~ i=1,2,3$ are the displacements in the $x_1, x_2, x_3\,$ directions.

== Stresses ==
For an isotropic, linear elastic material, the stress tensor that results from a state of antiplane shear can be expressed as

$$\boldsymbol{\sigma} \equiv
\begin{bmatrix}
\sigma_{11} & \sigma_{12} & \sigma_{13} \\
\sigma_{12} & \sigma_{22} & \sigma_{23} \\
\sigma_{13} & \sigma_{23} & \sigma_{33}
\end{bmatrix} =
\begin{bmatrix} 0 & 0 & \mu~\cfrac{\partial u_3}{\partial x_1} \\
0 & 0 & \mu~\cfrac{\partial u_3}{\partial x_2} \\
\mu~\cfrac{\partial u_3}{\partial x_1} & \mu~\cfrac{\partial u_3}{\partial x_2} & 0 \end{bmatrix}$$

where $\mu\,$ is the shear modulus of the material.

== Equilibrium equation for antiplane shear ==
The conservation of linear momentum in the absence of inertial forces takes the form of the equilibrium equation. For general states of stress there are three equilibrium equations. However, for antiplane shear, with the assumption that body forces in the 1 and 2 directions are 0, these reduce to one equilibrium equation which is expressed as

$$\mu~\nabla^2 u_3 + b_3(x_1, x_2) = 0$$

where $b_3$ is the body force in the $x_3$ direction and $\nabla^2 u_3 = \cfrac{\partial^2 u_3}{\partial x_1^2} + \cfrac{\partial^2 u_3}{\partial x_2^2}$. Note that this equation is valid only for infinitesimal strains.

== Applications ==
The antiplane shear assumption is used to determine the stresses and displacements due to a screw dislocation.

== See also ==
- Infinitesimal strain theory
- Deformation (mechanics)
