= Walter Boas =

German-Australian metallurgist

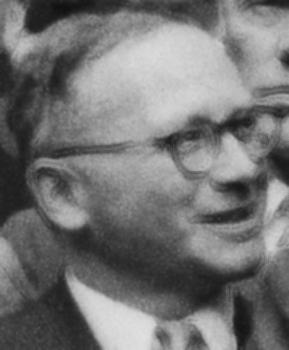
- 1952 in London
- Born: 10 February 1904; Berlin
- Died: 12 May 1982 (aged 78); Prahran (Melbourne)
- Education: Technische Universität Berlin
- Awards: Fellow of the Australian Academy of Science
- Scientific career
- Fields: Metallurgy; Physics
- Workplaces: University of Melbourne

Walter Moritz Boas FAA (10 February 1904 – 12 May 1982) was a German-Australian metallurgist.

Boas was born in Berlin, Germany and was educated at the Technische Hochschule in Charlottenburg (now Technische Universität Berlin; Dip. Engin. 1928, Dr.-Ing. 1930). After several positions at German and Swiss institutions, Boas became a lecturer in metallurgy at University of Melbourne in 1938; then from 1940 to 1947, senior lecturer. From 1947 to 1949, Boas was principal research officer, CSIR Division of Tribophysics; and from 1949 to 1969 chief of the division.

The Walter Boas Medal of the Australian Institute of Physics is named in his honour.
