= Critical resolved shear stress =

Component of shear stress necessary to initiate slip in a crystal

In materials science, critical resolved shear stress (CRSS) is the shear stress that is necessary to initiate slip on a particular slip system in a grain. Resolved shear stress (RSS) is the shear component of an applied tensile or compressive stress resolved in the slip direction on a slip plane that is neither perpendicular nor parallel to the stress axis. The RSS is related to the applied stress by a geometrical factor, m, typically called the Schmid factor:

$\tau_\text{RSS} = \sigma_\text{app} m = \sigma_\text{app} (\cos \phi \cos \lambda)$

where $\sigma_\mathrm{app}$ is the magnitude of the applied tensile stress, $\phi$ is the angle between the normal of the slip plane and the direction of the applied force, and $\lambda$ is the angle between the slip direction and the direction of the applied force. The Schmid factor is most applicable to FCC single-crystal metals, but for polycrystal metals the Taylor factor has been shown to be more accurate. The CRSS is the value of resolved shear stress at which yielding of the grain occurs, marking the onset of plastic deformation. CRSS, therefore, is a material property and is not dependent on the applied load or grain orientation. The CRSS is related to the observed yield strength of the material by the maximum value of the Schmid factor:

$\sigma_y=\frac{\tau_\text{CRSS}}{m_\text{max}}$

CRSS is a constant for crystal families. Hexagonal close-packed crystals, for example, have three main families - basal, prismatic, and pyramidal - with different values for the critical resolved shear stress.

== Slip systems and resolved shear stress ==
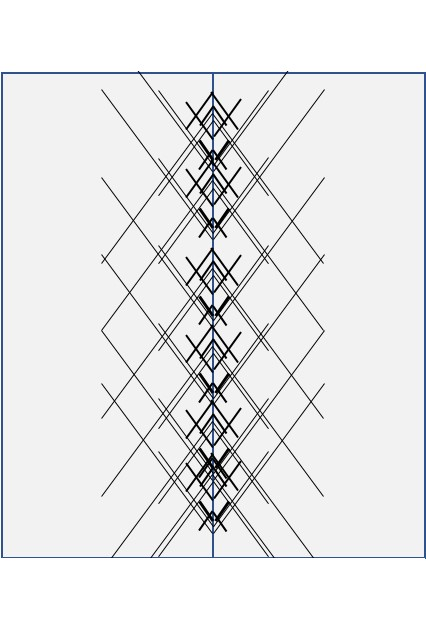
Slip systems activated near grain boundary to ensure compatibility.

In crystalline metals, slip occurs in specific directions on crystallographic planes, and each combination of slip direction and slip plane will have its own Schmid factor. As an example, for a face-centered cubic (FCC) system the primary slip plane is {111} and primary slip directions exist within the <110> permutation families. The Schmid Factor for an axial applied stress in the $[001]$ direction, along the primary slip plane of $(1 1 1)$, with the critical applied shear stress acting in the $[110]$ direction can be calculated by quickly determining if any of the dot product between the axial applied stress and slip plane, or dot product of axial applied stress and shear stress direction equal to zero. For the example cited above, the dot product of axial applied stress in the $[001]$ direction and shear stress resulting from the former in the $[110]$ direction yields a zero. For such a case, it is suitable to find a permutation of the family of the <110> direction. For the example completed below, the $[101]$ permutation direction for the shear stress slip direction has been chosen:

$$\begin{align}
m_=&\frac{(1*0)+(0*0)+(1*1)}{((1)^2+0^2+1^2)^{1/2}(0^2+0^2+1^2)^{1/2}}*\frac{(1*0)+(1*0)+(1*1)}{(1^2+1^2+1^2)^{1/2}(0^2+0^2+1^2)^{1/2}}=&\frac{1}{\sqrt{6}}
\end{align}$$

In a single crystal sample, the macroscopic yield stress will be determined by the Schmid factor of the single grain. Thus, in general, different yield strengths will be observed for applied stresses along different crystallographic directions. In polycrystalline specimens, the yield strength of each grain is different depending on its maximum Schmid factor, which indicates the operational slip system(s). The macroscopically observed yield stress will be related to the material's CRSS by an average Schmid factor, which is roughly 1/3.06 for FCC and 1/2.75 for body-centered cubic (BCC) structures.

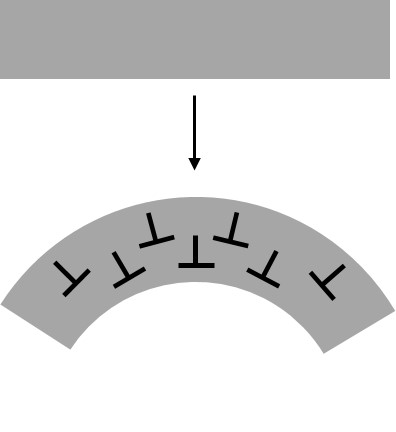
Geometrically necessary dislocations for bending of a bar of material.

The onset of plasticity in polycrystals is influenced by the number of available slip systems to accommodate incompatibilities at the grain boundaries. In the case of two adjacent, randomly oriented grains, one grain will have a larger Schmid factor and thus a smaller yield stress. Under load, this "weaker" grain will yield prior to the "stronger" grain, and as it deforms a stress concentration will build up in the stronger grain near the boundary between them. This stress concentration will activate dislocation motion in the available glide planes. These dislocations are geometrically necessary to ensure that the strain in each grain is equivalent at the grain boundary, so that the compatibility criteria are satisfied. G. I. Taylor showed that a minimum of five active slip systems are required to accommodate an arbitrary deformation. In crystal structures with fewer than 5 active slip systems, such as hexagonal close-packed (HCP) metals, the specimen will exhibit brittle failure instead of plastic deformation.

Slip Systems in Crystalline Metals
Crystal Structure	Primary Slip System	Number of Independent Systems
Face-centered cubic (FCC)	{111}<1-10>	5
Body-centered cubic (BCC)	{110}<-111>	5
Hexagonal close-packed (HCP)	{0001}<11-20>	2

== Effects of temperature and solid solution strengthening ==
At lower temperatures, more energy (i.e. - larger applied stress) is required to activate some slip systems. This is particularly evident in BCC materials, in which not all 5 independent slip systems are thermally activated at temperatures below the ductile-to-brittle transition temperature, or DBTT, so BCC specimens therefore become brittle. In general BCC metals have higher critical resolved shear stress values compared to FCC. However, the relationship between the CRSS and temperature and strain rate is worth examining further.

The relationship between CRSS and temperature and strain rate. In region I, the athermal and thermally dependent components of CRSS are active. At the boundary between I and II, $\tau^*$ becomes 0. Finally, at very high temperatures, the CRSS decreases as diffusion processes start to play a significant role in plastic deformation. Increasing strain rate shifts the trend to the right and therefore does not increase CRSS in the intermediate temperatures of region II.

To understand the relationship between stress and temperature observed, we first divide the critical resolved shear stress into the sum of two components: an athermal term described as $\tau_a$ and a thermally dependent term known as $\tau^*$ where

$$\begin{align}
\tau_\text{CRSS} = \tau_a+\tau^*
\end{align}$$

$\tau_a$ can be attributed to the stresses involved with dislocation motion while dislocations move in long-range internal stress fields. These long-range stresses arise from the presence of other dislocations. $\tau^*$ however is attributed to short range internal stress fields that arise from defect atoms or precipitates within the lattice that are obstacles for dislocation glide. With increasing temperature, the dislocations within the material have sufficient energy to overcome these short-range stresses. This explains the trend in region I where stress decreases with temperature. At the boundary between region’s I and II, the $\tau^*$ term is effectively zero and the critical resolved shear stress is completely described by the athermal term, i.e. long-range internal stress fields are still significant. In the third region, diffusive processes begin to play a significant role in plastic deformation of the material and so the critically resolved shear stress decreases once again with temperature. Within region three, the equation suggested earlier no longer applies. Region I has a temperature upper bound of approximately $T\le 0.25 T_m$ while region III occurs at values $T\ge 0.7 T_m$ where $T_m$ is the melting temperature of the material. The figure also shows the effect of increased strain rate generally increasing the critical resolved shear stress for a constant temperature as this increases the dislocation density in the material. Note that for intermediate temperatures, i.e. region II, there is a region where the strain rate has no effect on the stress. Increasing the strain rate does shift the graph to the right as more energy is needed to balance the short-term stresses with the resulting increased dislocation density.

The thermal component, $\tau^*$ can be expressed in the following manner.

$$\begin{align}
\left(\frac{\tau^*}{\tau^*_0}\right)^\frac{1}{2} = 1 - \left(\frac{T}{T_c}\right)^\frac{1}{2}
\end{align}$$

Where $\tau^*_0$ is the thermal component at 0 K and $T_c$ is the temperature at which the thermal energy is sufficient to overcome the obstacles causing stress, i.e. the temperature at the transition from 1 to 2. The above equation has been verified experimentally. In general, the CRSS increases as the homologous temperature decreases because it becomes energetically more costly to activate the slip systems, although this effect is much less pronounced in FCC.

Solid solution strengthening also increases the CRSS compared to a pure single component material because the solute atoms distort the lattice, preventing the dislocation motion necessary for plasticity. With dislocation motion inhibited, it becomes harder to activate the necessary 5 independent slip systems, so the material becomes stronger and more brittle.
