= Slip (materials science) =

Displacement between parts of a crystal along a crystallographic plane

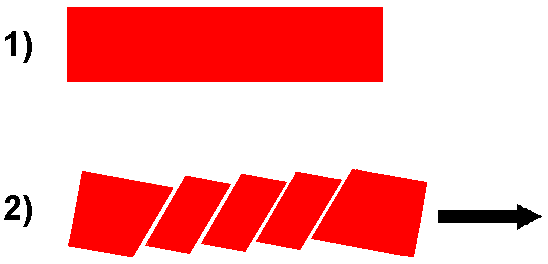
Schematic view of slip mechanism

In materials science, slip is the large displacement of one part of a crystal relative to another part along crystallographic planes and directions. Slip occurs by the passage of dislocations on close/packed planes, which are planes containing the greatest number of atoms per area and in close-packed directions (most atoms per length). Close-packed planes are known as slip or glide planes. A slip system describes the set of symmetrically identical slip planes and associated family of slip directions for which dislocation motion can easily occur and lead to plastic deformation. The magnitude and direction of slip are represented by the Burgers vector, b.

An external force makes parts of the crystal lattice glide along each other, changing the material's geometry. A critical resolved shear stress is required to initiate a slip.

== Slip systems ==
=== Face centered cubic crystals ===
Unit cell of an fcc material.

Lattice configuration of the close packed slip plane in an fcc material. The arrow represents the Burgers vector in this dislocation glide system.

Slip in face centered cubic (fcc) crystals occurs along the close packed plane. Specifically, the slip plane is of type {111}, and the direction is of type <1̅10>. In the diagram on the right, the specific plane and direction are (111) and [1̅10], respectively.

Given the permutations of the slip plane types and direction types, fcc crystals have 12 slip systems. In the fcc lattice, the norm of the Burgers vector, b, can be calculated using the following equation:

$|b|= \frac {a}{2}|\langle 110\rangle|= \frac{a\sqrt 2}{2}$

Where a is the lattice constant of the unit cell.

=== Body centered cubic crystals ===
Unit cell of a bcc material.

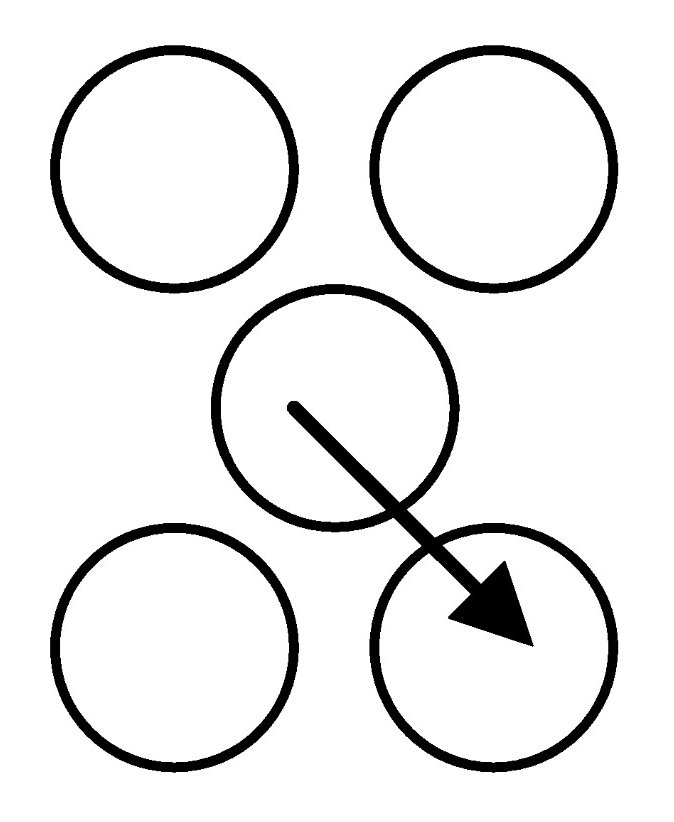
Lattice configuration of the slip plane in a bcc material. The arrow represents the Burgers vector in this dislocation glide system.

Slip in body-centered cubic (bcc) crystals occurs along the plane of shortest Burgers vector as well; however, unlike fcc, there are no truly close-packed planes in the bcc crystal structure. Thus, a slip system in bcc requires heat to activate.

Some bcc materials (e.g. α-Fe) can contain up to 48 slip systems. There are six slip planes of type {110}, each with two <111> directions (12 systems). There are 24 {123} and 12 {112} planes each with one <111> direction (36 systems, for a total of 48). Although the number of possible slip systems is much higher in bcc crystals than fcc crystals, the ductility is not necessarily higher due to increased lattice friction stresses. While the {123} and {112} planes are not exactly identical in activation energy to {110}, they are so close in energy that for all intents and purposes they can be treated as identical. In the diagram on the right the specific slip plane and direction are (110) and [1̅11], respectively.

$|b|= \frac {a}{2}|\langle 111\rangle|= \frac{\sqrt 3a}{2}$

=== Hexagonal close packed crystals ===
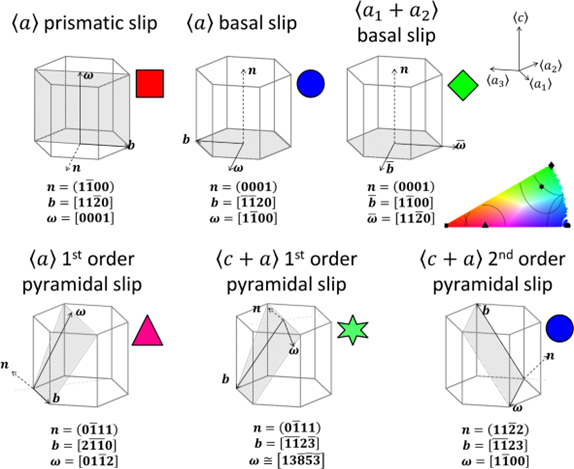
Slip systems in zirconium alloys. 𝒃 and 𝒏 are the slip direction and plane, respectively, and 𝝎 is the rotation axis calculated in the present work, orthogonal to both the slip plane normal and slip direction. The crystal direction of the rotation axis vectors is labelled on the IPF colour key.

Slip in hexagonal close packed (hcp) metals is much more limited than in bcc and fcc crystal structures. Usually, hcp crystal structures allow slip on the densely packed basal {0001} planes along the <112̅0> directions. The activation of other slip planes depends on various parameters, e.g. the c/a ratio. Since there are only 2 independent slip systems on the basal planes, for arbitrary plastic deformation additional slip or twin systems needs to be activated. This typically requires a much higher resolved shear stress and can result in the brittle behavior of some hcp polycrystals. However, other hcp materials such as pure titanium show large amounts of ductility.

Cadmium, zinc, magnesium, titanium, and beryllium have a slip plane at {0001} and a slip direction of <112̅0>. This creates a total of three slip systems, depending on orientation. Other combinations are also possible.

There are two types of dislocations in crystals that can induce slip - edge dislocations and screw dislocations. Edge dislocations have the direction of the Burgers vector perpendicular to the dislocation line, while screw dislocations have the direction of the Burgers vector parallel to the dislocation line. The type of dislocations generated largely depends on the direction of the applied stress, temperature, and other factors. Screw dislocations can easily cross slip from one plane to another if the other slip plane contains the direction of the Burgers vector.

== Slip band ==
A slip band formed on a ferrite grain in an aged hardened stainless steel. The slip band at the centre of the image was observed at a certain load, then the load was increased with a burst of dislocations coming out of the slip band tip as a response to the load increment. This burst of dislocations and topographic change ahead of the slip band was observed across different slip bands (see the supplementary information of the paper). image length is 10 um.

Formation of slip bands indicates a concentrated unidirectional slip on certain planes causing a stress concentration. Typically, slip bands induce surface steps (i.e. roughness due persistent slip bands during fatigue) and a stress concentration which can be a crack nucleation site. Slip bands extend until impinged by a boundary, and the generated stress from dislocation pile-up against that boundary will either stop or transmit the operating slip.

Formation of slip bands under cyclic conditions is addressed as persistent slip bands (PSBs) where formation under monotonic condition is addressed as dislocation planar arrays (or simply slip-bands). Slip-bands can be simply viewed as boundary sliding due to dislocation glide that lacks (the complexity of ) PSBs high plastic deformation localisation manifested by tongue- and ribbon-like extrusion. And, where PSBs normally studied with (effective) Burger's vector aligned with extrusion plane because PSB extends across the grain and exacerbate during fatigue; monotonic slip-band has a Burger's vector for propagation and another for plane extrusions both controlled by the conditions at the tip.

== Identification of slip activity ==
The main methods to identify the active slip system involve either slip trace analysis of single crystals or polycrystals, using diffraction techniques such as neutron diffraction and high angular resolution electron backscatter diffraction elastic strain analysis, or Transmission electron microscopy diffraction imaging of dislocations.

In slip trace analysis, only the slip plane is measured, and the slip direction is inferred. In zirconium, for example, this enables the identification of slip activity on a basal, prism, or 1st/2nd order pyramidal plane. In the case of a 1st-order pyramidal plane trace, the slip could be in either ⟨𝑎⟩ or ⟨𝑐 + 𝑎⟩ directions; slip trace analysis cannot discriminate between these.

Diffraction-based studies measure the residual dislocation content instead of the slipped dislocations, which is only a good approximation for systems that accumulate networks of geometrically necessary dislocations, such as Face-centred cubic polycrystals. In low-symmetry crystals such as hexagonal zirconium, there could be regions of the predominantly single slip where geometrically necessary dislocations may not necessarily accumulate. Residual dislocation content does not distinguish between glissile and sessile dislocations. Glissile dislocations contribute to slip and hardening, but sessile dislocations contribute only to latent hardening.

Diffraction methods cannot generally resolve the slip plane of a residual dislocation. For example, in Zr, the screw components of ⟨𝑎⟩ dislocations could slip on prismatic, basal, or 1st-order pyramidal planes. Similarly, ⟨𝑐 + 𝑎⟩ screw dislocations could slip on either 1st or 2nd order pyramidal planes.

== See also ==
- Miller indices
- Persistent slip bands
