= Cross slip =

Movement of a screw dislocation between crystallographic planes

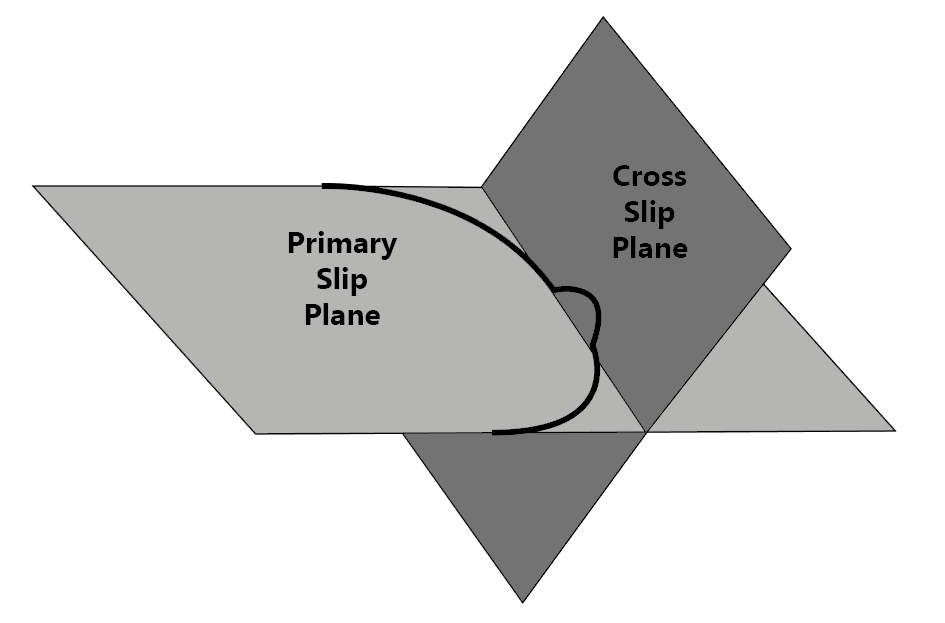
The screw component of a mixed dislocation loop can move to another slip plane, called the cross-slip plane. Here the Burgers vector is along the intersection of the planes.

In materials science, cross slip is the process by which a screw dislocation moves from one slip plane to another due to local stresses. It allows non-planar movement of screw dislocations. Non-planar movement of edge dislocations is achieved through climb.

Since the Burgers vector of a perfect screw dislocation is parallel to the dislocation line, it has an infinite number of possible slip planes (planes containing the dislocation line and the Burgers vector), unlike an edge or mixed dislocation, which has a unique slip plane. Therefore, a screw dislocation can glide or slip along any plane that contains its Burgers vector. During cross slip, the screw dislocation switches from gliding along one slip plane to gliding along a different slip plane, called the cross-slip plane. The cross slip of moving dislocations can be seen by transmission electron microscopy.

== Mechanisms ==
The possible cross-slip planes are determined by the crystal system. In body centered cubic (BCC) metals, a screw dislocation with b=0.5<1̅11> can glide on {110}, {112}, or {123} planes, all of which have comparable packing densities. In face centered cubic (FCC) metals, screw dislocations can cross-slip from one {111} type plane to another. However, in FCC metals, pure screw dislocations dissociate into two mixed partial dislocations on a {111} plane, and the extended screw dislocation can only glide on the plane containing the two partial dislocations. The Friedel-Escaig mechanism and the Fleischer mechanism have been proposed to explain the cross-slip of partial dislocations in FCC metals.

In the Friedel-Escaig mechanism, the two partial dislocations constrict to a point, forming a perfect screw dislocation on their original glide plane, and then re-dissociate on the cross-slip plane creating two different partial dislocations. Shear stresses then may drive the dislocation to extend and move onto the cross-slip plane. Atomic simulations have confirmed the Friedel-Escaig mechanism.

Alternatively, in the Fleischer mechanism, one partial dislocation is emitted onto the cross-slip plane, and then the two partial dislocations constrict on the cross-slip plane, creating a stair-rod dislocation. Then the other partial dislocation combines with the stair-rod dislocation so that both partial dislocations are on the cross-slip plane. Since the stair rod and the new partial dislocations are high energy, this mechanism would require very high stresses.

== Role in plasticity ==
Cross-slip is important to plasticity, since it allows additional slip planes to become active and allows screw dislocations to bypass obstacles. Screw dislocations can move around obstacles in their primary slip plane (the plane with the highest resolved shear stress). A screw dislocation may glide onto a different slip plane until it has passed the obstacle, and then can return to the primary slip plane. Screw dislocations can then avoid obstacles through conservative motion (without requiring atomic diffusion), unlike edge dislocations which must climb to move around obstacles. Therefore, some methods of increasing the yield stress of a material such as solid solution strengthening are less effective because due to cross slip they do not block the motion of screw dislocations.

At high strain rates (during stage II work hardening), discrete dislocation dynamics (DD) simulations have suggested that cross-slip promotes the generation of dislocations and increases dislocation velocity in a way that is dependent on strain rate, which has the effect of decreasing flow stress and work hardening.

Cross slip also plays an important role in dynamic recovery (stage III work hardening) by promoting annihilation of screw dislocations and then movement of screw dislocations into a lower energy arrangement.

== See also ==
- Slip
- Plastic deformation
- Miller indices
