= Solid solution strengthening =

Type of alloying which improves strength of pure metals

In metallurgy, solid solution strengthening is a type of alloying that can be used to improve the strength of a pure metal. The technique works by adding atoms of one element (the alloying element) to the crystalline lattice of another element (the base metal), forming a solid solution. The local nonuniformity in the lattice due to the alloying element makes plastic deformation more difficult by impeding dislocation motion through stress fields. In contrast, alloying beyond the solubility limit can form a second phase, leading to strengthening via other mechanisms (e.g. the precipitation of intermetallic compounds).

== Types ==
Substitutional solute in lattice

Depending on the size of the alloying element, a substitutional solid solution or an interstitial solid solution can form. In both cases, atoms are visualised as rigid spheres where the overall crystal structure is essentially unchanged. The rationale of crystal geometry to atom solubility prediction is summarized in the Hume-Rothery rules and Pauling's rules.

Substitutional solid solution strengthening occurs when the solute atom is large enough that it can replace solvent atoms in their lattice positions. Some alloying elements are only soluble in small amounts, whereas some solvent and solute pairs form a solution over the whole range of binary compositions. Generally, higher solubility is seen when solvent and solute atoms are similar in atomic size (15% according to the Hume-Rothery rules) and adopt the same crystal structure in their pure form. Examples of completely miscible binary systems are Cu-Ni and the Ag-Au face-centered cubic (FCC) binary systems, and the Mo-W body-centered cubic (BCC) binary system.

Interstitial solutes in lattice

Interstitial solid solutions form when the solute atom is small enough (radii up to 57% the radii of the parent atoms) to fit at interstitial sites between the solvent atoms. The atoms crowd into the interstitial sites, causing the bonds of the solvent atoms to compress and thus deform (this rationale can be explained with Pauling's rules). Elements commonly used to form interstitial solid solutions include H, Li, Na, N, C, and O. Carbon in iron (steel) is one example of interstitial solid solution.

== Mechanism ==
The strength of a material is dependent on how easily dislocations in its crystal lattice can be propagated. These dislocations create stress fields within the material depending on their character. When solute atoms are introduced, local stress fields are formed that interact with those of the dislocations, impeding their motion and causing an increase in the yield stress of the material, which means an increase in strength of the material. This gain is a result of both lattice distortion and the modulus effect.

When solute and solvent atoms differ in size, local stress fields are created that can attract or repel dislocations in their vicinity. This is known as the size effect. By relieving tensile or compressive strain in the lattice, the solute size mismatch can put the dislocation in a lower energy state. In substitutional solid solutions, these stress fields are spherically symmetric, meaning they have no shear stress component. As such, substitutional solute atoms do not interact with the shear stress fields characteristic of screw dislocations. Conversely, in interstitial solid solutions, solute atoms cause a tetragonal distortion, generating a shear field that can interact with edge, screw, and mixed dislocations. The attraction or repulsion of the dislocation to the solute atom depends on whether the atom sits above or below the slip plane. For example, consider an edge dislocation encountering a smaller solute atom above its slip plane. In this case, the interaction energy is negative, resulting in attraction of the dislocation to the solute. This is due to the reduced dislocation energy by the compressed volume lying above the dislocation core. If the solute atom were positioned below the slip plane, the dislocation would be repelled by the solute. However, the overall interaction energy between an edge dislocation and a smaller solute is negative because the dislocation spends more time at sites with attractive energy. This is also true for solute atom with size greater than the solvent atom. Thus, the interaction energy dictated by the size effect is generally negative.

The elastic modulus of the solute atom can also determine the extent of strengthening. For a "soft" solute with elastic modulus lower than that of the solvent, the interaction energy due to modulus mismatch (U_{modulus}) is negative, which reinforce the size interaction energy (U_{size}). In contrast, U_{modulus} is positive for a "hard" solute, which results in lower total interaction energy than a soft atom. Even though the interaction force is negative (attractive) in both cases when the dislocation is approaching the solute. The maximum force (F_{max}) necessary to tear dislocation away from the lowest energy state (i.e. the solute atom) is greater for the soft solute than the hard one. As a result, a soft solute will strengthen a crystal more than a hard solute due to the synergistic strengthening by combining both size and modulus effects.

The elastic interaction effects (i.e. size and modulus effects) dominate solid-solution strengthening for most crystalline materials. However, other effects, including charge and stacking fault effects, may also play a role. For ionic solids where electrostatic interaction dictates bond strength, charge effect is also important. For example, addition of divalent ion to a monovalent material may strengthen the electrostatic interaction between the solute and the charged matrix atoms that comprise a dislocation. However, this strengthening is to a less extent than the elastic strengthening effects. For materials containing a higher density of stacking faults, solute atoms may interact with the stacking faults either attractively or repulsively. This lowers the stacking fault energy, leading to repulsion of the partial dislocations, which thus makes the material stronger.

Surface carburizing, or case hardening, is one example of solid solution strengthening in which the density of solute carbon atoms is increased close to the surface of the steel, resulting in a gradient of carbon atoms throughout the material. This provides superior mechanical properties to the surface of the steel without having to use a higher-cost material for the component.

== Governing equations ==
Solid solution strengthening increases yield strength of the material by increasing the shear stress, $\tau$, to move dislocations:

$\Delta \tau =Gb \epsilon^\tfrac 3 2 \sqrt c$

where c is the concentration of the solute atoms, G is the shear modulus, b is the magnitude of the Burger's vector, and $\epsilon$ is the lattice strain due to the solute. This is composed of two terms, one describing lattice distortion and the other local modulus change.

$\epsilon = | \epsilon_G - \beta \epsilon_a |$ Here, $\epsilon_G$ the term that captures the local modulus change, $\beta$ a constant dependent on the solute atoms and $\epsilon_a$ is the lattice distortion term.

The lattice distortion term can be described as:

$\epsilon_a = \dfrac {\Delta a}{a\Delta c}$, where a is the lattice parameter of the material.

Meanwhile, the local modulus change is captured in the following expression:

$\epsilon_G = \dfrac {\Delta G}{G\Delta c}$, where G is shear modulus of the solute material.

== Implications ==
In order to achieve noticeable material strengthening via solution strengthening, one should alloy with solutes of higher shear modulus, hence increasing the local shear modulus in the material. In addition, one should alloy with elements of different equilibrium lattice constants. The greater the difference in lattice parameter, the higher the local stress fields introduced by alloying. Alloying with elements of higher shear modulus or of very different lattice parameters will increase the stiffness and introduce local stress fields respectively. In either case, the dislocation propagation will be hindered at these sites, impeding plasticity and increasing yield strength proportionally with solute concentration.

Solid solution strengthening depends on:

- Concentration of solute atoms
- Shear modulus of solute atoms
- Size of solute atoms
- Valency of solute atoms (for ionic materials)

For many common alloys, rough experimental fits can be found for the addition in strengthening provided in the form of:

$\Delta\sigma_s = k_s\sqrt{c}$

where $k_s$ is a solid solution strengthening coefficient and $c$ is the concentration of solute in atomic fractions.

Nevertheless, one should not add so much solute as to precipitate a new phase. This occurs if the concentration of the solute reaches a certain critical point given by the binary system phase diagram. This critical concentration therefore puts a limit to the amount of solid solution strengthening that can be achieved with a given material.

== Examples ==
=== Aluminum alloys ===
An example of aluminum alloys where solid solution strengthening happens by adding magnesium and manganese into the aluminum matrix. Commercially Mn can be added to the AA3xxx series and Mg can be added to the AA5xxx series. Mn addition to the Aluminum alloys assists in the recrystallization and recovery of the alloy which influences the grain size as well. Both of these systems are used in low to medium-strength applications, with appreciable formability and corrosion resistance.

=== Nickel-based superalloys ===
Many nickel-based superalloys depend on solid solution as a strengthening mechanism. The most popular example is the Inconel family, where many of these alloys contain chromium and iron and some other additions of cobalt, molybdenum, niobium, and titanium. The nickel-based superalloys are well known for their intensive use in the industrial field especially the aeronautical and the aerospace industry due to their superior mechanical and corrosion properties at high temperatures.

An example of the use of the nickel-based superalloys in the industrial field would be turbine blades. In practice, this alloy is known as MAR—M200 and is solid solution strengthened by chromium, tungsten and cobalt in the matrix and is also precipitation hardened by carbide and boride precipitates at the grain boundaries. The key impacting factor for these turbine blades lies in the grain size which an increase in grain size can lead to a significant reduction in the strain rate. An example of this reduced strain rate in MAR--M200 can be seen in the figures to the right where the figure on the bottom has a grain size of 100um and the figure on the top has a grain size of 10mm.

This reduced strain rate is extremely important for turbine blade operation because they undergo significant mechanical stress and high temperatures which can lead to the onset of creep deformation. Therefore, the precise control of grain size in nickel-based superalloys is key to creep resistance and mechanical reliability and longevity. Some ways to control the grain size lie in the manufacturing techniques like directional solidification and single crystal casting.

=== Stainless steel ===
Stainless steel is one of the most commonly used metals in many industries. Solid solution strengthening of steel is one of the mechanisms used to enhance the properties of the alloy. Austenitic steels mainly contain chromium, nickel, molybdenum, and manganese. It is being used mostly for cookware, kitchen equipment, and in marine applications for its good corrosion properties in saline environments.

=== Titanium alloys ===
Titanium and titanium alloys have been wide usage in aerospace, medical, and maritime applications. The most known titanium alloy that adopts solid solution strengthening is Ti-6Al-4V. Also, the addition of oxygen to pure Ti alloy adopts a solid solution strengthening as a mechanism to the material, while adding it to Ti-6Al-4V alloy doesn't have the same influence.

=== Copper alloys ===
Bronze and brass are both copper alloys that are solid solution strengthened. Bronze is the result of adding about 12% tin to copper while brass is the result of adding about 34% zinc to copper. Both of these alloys are being utilized in coins production, ship hardware, and art.

== See also ==
- Strength of materials
- Strengthening mechanisms of materials
