= Micropipe =

Type of defect in a crystal

A micropipe, also called a micropore, microtube, capillary defect, or pinhole defect, is a crystallographic defect in a single-crystal substrate. Minimizing the presence of micropipes is important in semiconductor manufacturing, as their presence on a wafer can result in the failure of integrated circuits made from that wafer.

Micropipes are also relevant to makers of silicon carbide (SiC) substrates, used in a variety of industries such as power semiconductor devices for vehicles and high-frequency communication devices; during the production of these materials, the crystal undergoes internal and external stresses causing growth of defects, or dislocations, within the atomic lattice.

A screw dislocation is a common dislocation that transforms successive atomic planes within a crystal lattice into the shape of a helix. Once a screw dislocation propagates through the bulk of a sample during the wafer growth process, a micropipe is formed.

Micropipes and screw dislocations in epitaxial layers are normally derived from the substrates on which the epitaxy is performed. Micropipes are considered to be empty-core screw dislocations with large strain energy (i.e. they have large Burgers vector); they follow the growth direction (c-axis) in silicon carbide boules and substrates propagating into the deposited epitaxial layers.

Factors which influence formation of micropipes (and other defects) are such growth parameters as temperature, supersaturation, vapor phase stoichiometry, impurities and the polarity of the seed crystal surface.
