= Indentation size effect =

Property of materials at small scales

Higher hardness values are measured at lower indent depths which correspond to smaller indent areas. The increase measured hardness is believed to be the result of geometrically necessary dislocations. $H_0$ is the hardness due solely to statistically stored dislocations without the impact of geometrically necessary dislocations.

The indentation size effect (ISE) is the observation that hardness tends to increase as the indent size decreases at small scales. When an indent (any small mark, but usually made with a special tool) is created during material testing, the hardness of the material is not constant. At the small scale, materials will actually be harder than at the macro-scale. For the conventional indentation size effect, the smaller the indentation, the larger the difference in hardness. The effect has been seen through nanoindentation and microindentation measurements at varying depths. Dislocations increase material hardness by increasing flow stress through dislocation blocking mechanisms. Materials contain statistically stored dislocations (SSD) which are created by homogeneous strain and are dependent upon the material and processing conditions. Geometrically necessary dislocations (GND) on the other hand are formed, in addition to the dislocations statistically present, to maintain continuity within the material.

These additional geometrically necessary dislocations (GND) further increase the flow stress in the material and therefore the measured hardness. Theory suggests that plastic flow is impacted by both strain and the size of the strain gradient experienced in the material. Smaller indents have higher strain gradients relative to the size of the plastic zone and therefore have a higher measured hardness in some materials.

Indenter tip generating geometrically necessary dislocations

For practical purposes this effect means that hardness in the low micro and nano regimes cannot be directly compared if measured using different loads. However, the benefit of this effect is that it can be used to measure the effects of strain gradients on plasticity. Several new plasticity models have been developed using data from indentation size effect studies, which can be applied to high strain gradient situations such as thin films.
