= Lomer–Cottrell junction =

In materials science, a Lomer–Cottrell junction is a particular configuration of dislocations that forms when two perfect dislocations interact on interacting slip planes in a crystalline material.

The sessile or immobile nature of the Lomer–Cottrell dislocation forms a strong barrier to further dislocation motion. Trailing dislocations pile up behind this junction, leading to an increase in the stress required to sustain deformation. This mechanism is a key contributor to work hardening in ductile materials like aluminum and copper.

== Formation Mechanism ==
When two perfect dislocations encounter along a slip plane, each perfect dislocation can split into two Shockley partial dislocations: a leading dislocation and a trailing dislocation. When the two leading Shockley partials combine, they form a separate dislocation with a burgers vector that is not in the slip plane. This is the Lomer–Cottrell dislocation. It is sessile and immobile in the slip plane, acting as a barrier against other dislocations in the plane. The trailing dislocations pile up behind the Lomer–Cottrell dislocation, and an ever greater force is required to push additional dislocations into the pile-up.

== Example in FCC Crystals ==
For an FCC crystal with slip planes of the form {111}, consider the following reactions:

- Dissociation of dislocations:

$$\frac{a}{2}[\text{0 1 1}] \rightarrow \frac{a}{6}[\text{1 1 2}] + \frac{a}{6}[\text{-1 2 1}]$$
$$\frac{a}{2}[\text{1 0 -1}] \rightarrow \frac{a}{6}[\text{1 1 -2}] + \frac{a}{6}[\text{2 -1 -1}]$$

- Combination of leading dislocations:

$$\frac{a}{6}[\text{1 1 2}] + \frac{a}{6}[\text{1 1 -2}] \rightarrow \frac{a}{3}[\text{1 1 0}]$$

The resulting dislocation lies along a crystal direction that is not a slip plane at room temperature in FCC materials. This configuration contributes to immobility of the Lomer-Cottrell junction.
