= Lomer =

Lomer is a given name and surname. It can refer to:

== People ==
- George Lomer (1904–1966), Australian rules footballer
- Kathryn Lomer (born 1958), Australian novelist
- Lomer Brisson (1916–1981), Canadian politician and lawyer
- Lomer Gouin (1861–1929), Canadian politician, premier of Quebec
- Lomer (saint) (died 593), Christian saint

== Places ==
- Saint-Lomer, a former village now part of Courtomer, Orne
- Lomer (village), a village in Hampshire depopulated by the Black Death

== Other ==
- Lomer–Cottrell junction. In materials science, a particular configuration of dislocations
