= Recovery (metallurgy) =

Reduction in the dislocation density of a material's grains

In metallurgy, recovery is a process by which a metal or alloy's deformed grains can reduce their stored energy by the removal or rearrangement of defects in their crystal structure. These defects, primarily dislocations, are introduced by plastic deformation of the material and act to increase the yield strength of a material. Since recovery reduces the dislocation density, the process is normally accompanied by a reduction in a material's strength and a simultaneous increase in the ductility. As a result, recovery may be considered beneficial or detrimental depending on the circumstances.

Recovery is related to the similar processes of recrystallization and grain growth, each of them being stages of annealing. Recovery competes with recrystallization, as both are driven by the stored energy, but is also thought to be a necessary prerequisite for the nucleation of recrystallized grains. It is so called because there is a recovery of the electrical conductivity due to a reduction in dislocations. This creates defect-free channels, giving electrons an increased mean free path.

== Definition ==
The physical processes that fall under the designations of recovery, recrystallization and grain growth are often difficult to distinguish in a precise manner. Doherty et al. (1998) stated:

"The authors have agreed that ... recovery can be defined as all annealing processes occurring in deformed materials that occur without the migration of a high-angle grain boundary"

Thus the process can be differentiated from recrystallization and grain growth as both feature extensive movement of high-angle grain boundaries.

If recovery occurs during deformation (a situation that is common in high-temperature processing) then it is referred to as 'dynamic' while recovery that occurs after processing is termed 'static'. The principal difference is that during dynamic recovery, stored energy continues to be introduced even as it is decreased by the recovery process - resulting in a form of dynamic equilibrium.

== Process ==
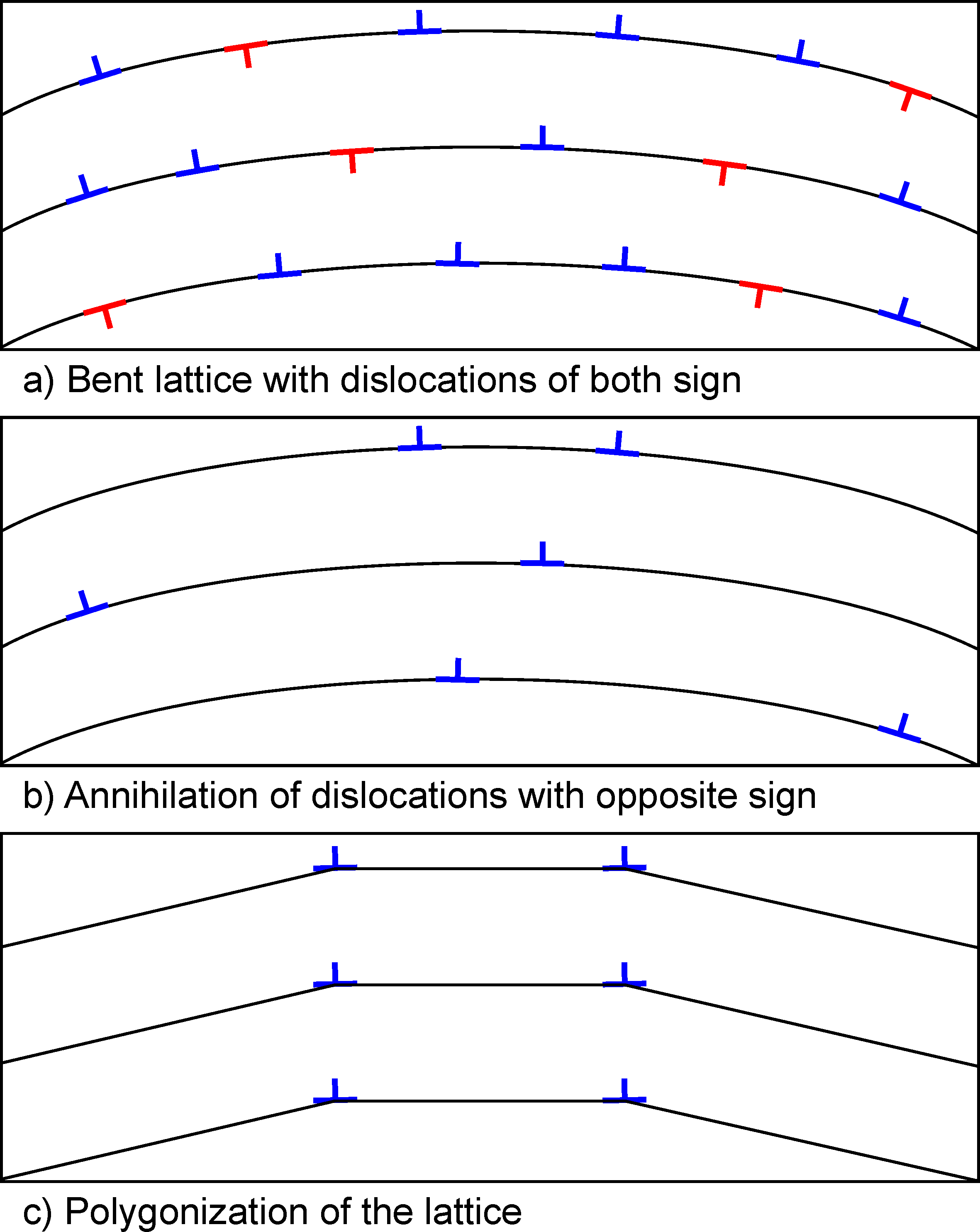
Fig 1. The annihilation and reorganisation of an array of edge dislocations in a crystal lattice

Fig 2. Animation of the annihilation and reorganisation of edge dislocations in a crystal lattice

=== Deformed structure ===
A heavily deformed metal contains a huge number of dislocations predominantly caught up in 'tangles' or 'forests'. Dislocation motion is relatively difficult in a metal with a low stacking fault energy and so the dislocation distribution after deformation is largely random. In contrast, metals with moderate to high stacking fault energy, e.g. aluminum, tend to form a cellular structure where the cell walls consist of rough tangles of dislocations. The interiors of the cells have a correspondingly reduced dislocation density.

=== Annihilation ===
Each dislocation is associated with a strain field which contributes some small but finite amount to the materials stored energy. When the temperature is increased - typically below one-third of the absolute melting point - dislocations become mobile and are able to glide, cross-slip and climb. If two dislocations of opposite sign meet then they effectively cancel out and their contribution to the stored energy is removed. When annihilation is complete then only excess dislocation of one kind will remain.

=== Rearrangement ===
After annihilation any remaining dislocations can align themselves into ordered arrays where their individual contribution to the stored energy is reduced by the overlapping of their strain fields. The simplest case is that of an array of edge dislocations of identical Burger's vector. This idealized case can be produced by bending a single crystal that will deform on a single slip system (the original experiment performed by Cahn in 1949). The edge dislocations will rearrange themselves into tilt boundaries, a simple example of a low-angle grain boundary. Grain boundary theory predicts that an increase in boundary misorientation will increase the energy of the boundary but decrease the energy per dislocation. Thus, there is a driving force to produce fewer, more highly misoriented boundaries. The situation in highly deformed, polycrystalline materials is naturally more complex. Many dislocations of different Burger's vector can interact to form complex 2-D networks.

== Development of substructure ==
As mentioned above, the deformed structure is often a 3-D cellular structure with walls consisting of dislocation tangles. As recovery proceeds these cell walls will undergo a transition towards a genuine subgrain structure. This occurs through a gradual elimination of extraneous dislocations and the rearrangement of the remaining dislocations into low-angle grain boundaries.

Sub-grain formation is followed by subgrain coarsening where the average size increases while the number of subgrains decreases. This reduces the total area of grain boundary and hence the stored energy in the material. Subgrain coarsen shares many features with grain growth.

If the sub-structure can be approximated to an array of spherical subgrains of radius R and boundary energy γ_{s}; the stored energy is uniform; and the force on the boundary is evenly distributed, the driving pressure P is given by:

$$P = -\alpha\;R \frac{d}{dR} \left (\frac{\gamma\;_s}{R} \right )  \,\!$$

Since γ_{s} is dependent on the boundary misorientation of the surrounding subgrains, the driving pressure generally does not remain constant throughout coarsening.
