= Strain hardening exponent =

Measurement in material science

The strain hardening exponent (also called the strain hardening index), usually denoted $n$, is a measured parameter that quantifies the ability of a material to become stronger due to strain hardening. Strain hardening (work hardening) is the process by which a material's load-bearing capacity increases during plastic (permanent) strain, or deformation. This characteristic is what sets ductile materials apart from brittle materials. The uniaxial tension test is the primary experimental method used to directly measure a material's stress–strain behavior, providing valuable insights into its strain-hardening behavior.

The strain hardening exponent is sometimes regarded as a constant and occurs in forging and forming calculations, as well as the formula known as the Hollomon equation (after John Herbert Hollomon Jr.), originally posited as:

$\sigma=K\epsilon^n$

where $\sigma$ represents the applied true stress on the material, $\epsilon$ is the true strain, and $K$ is the strength coefficient.

The value of the strain hardening exponent lies between 0 and 1, with a value of 0 implying a perfectly plastic solid and a value of 1 representing a perfectly elastic solid. Most metals have an $n$-value between 0.10 and 0.50. In one study, strain hardening exponent values extracted from tensile data from 58 steel pipes from natural gas pipelines were found to range from 0.08 to 0.25, with the lower end of the range dominated by high-strength low alloy steels and the upper end of the range mostly normalized steels.

== Tabulation ==
Tabulation of $n$- and $K$-values for several alloys
Material	n	K (MPa)
Aluminum 1100–O (annealed)	0.20	180
2024 aluminum alloy (heat treated—T3)	0.16	690
5052-O	0.13	210
Aluminum 6061–O (annealed)	0.20	205
Aluminum 6061–T6	0.05	410
Aluminum 7075–O (annealed)	0.17	400
Brass, Naval (annealed)	0.49	895
Brass 70–30 (annealed)	0.49	900
Brass 85–15 (cold-rolled)	0.34	580
Cobalt-base alloy (heat-treated)	0.50	2,070
Copper (annealed)	0.54	325
AZ-31B magnesium alloy (annealed)	0.16	450
Low-carbon steel (annealed)	0.26	530
Low-carbon steel (cold worked)	0.08	700
4340 steel alloy (tempered @ 315 °C)	0.15	640
304 stainless steel (annealed)	0.450	1275
