= Etch pit density =

The etch pit density (EPD) is a measure for the quality of semiconductor wafers.

== Etching ==
An etch solution is applied on the surface of the wafer where the etch rate is increased at dislocations of the crystal resulting in pits. For GaAs one uses typically molten KOH at 450 degrees Celsius for about 40 minutes in a zirconium crucible. The density of the pits can be determined by optical contrast microscopy. Silicon wafers have usually a very low density of < 100 cm^{−2} while semi-insulating GaAs wafers have a density on the order of 10^{5} cm^{−2}.

== Germanium detectors ==
High-purity Germanium detectors require the Ge crystals to be grown with a controlled range of dislocation density to reduce impurities. The etch pit density requirement is typically within the range 10^{3} to 10^{4} cm^{−2}.

== Standards ==
The etch pit density can be determined according to DIN 50454-1 and ASTM F 1404.
