= T1 process =

T1 process: four objects swap neighbours. Such a process is common during liquid foam or biological tissue deformation.

A T1 process (or topological rearrangement process of the first kind) is one of the main processes by which cellular materials such as foams or biological tissues change shape. It involves four discrete objects such as bubbles, drops, cells, etc. The four objects are initially arranged in a plane in the following way. Objects A and B are in contact and objects C and D are on either side of the AB group and touching both A and B. The T1 process consists of breaking the contact between A and B and establishing the contact between C and D.

When a significant number of rearrangement events such as T1 processes with similar orientations occur inside a foam or a tissue, the material correspondingly undergoes a deformation: it elongates in the direction in which neighbours depart (here, AB) while it contracts in the direction in which new neighbour pairs form (here, CD).

As a result of the existence of the T1 and similar processes, materials made of these objects have a number of similar rheological properties. Among these, plasticity allows them to be deformed irreversibly. For such materials, such irreversible deformations arise from the ability to rearrange their constitutive objects. Thus, the T1 process is the major mesoscopic ingredient of plasticity for these materials.
