= Mean inter-particle distance =

Physical quantity

Mean inter-particle distance (or mean inter-particle separation) is the mean distance between microscopic particles (usually atoms or molecules) in a macroscopic body, typically measured in Bohr radii.

== Ambiguity ==
From very general considerations, the mean inter-particle distance is proportional to the size of the per-particle volume 1/n, i.e.
$$\langle r \rangle \sim \frac{1}{\sqrt[3]{n}}$$
where $n = \frac{N}{V}$ is the particle density. However, barring a few simple cases such as the ideal gas model, precise calculations of the proportionality factor are impossible analytically. Therefore, approximate expressions are often used. $\frac{1}{\sqrt[3]{n}}$ is sometimes used as a direct approximation, since it corresponds to the length of the edge of a cube with per-particle volume 1/n. Another such estimation is the Wigner–Seitz radius
$$r_s = \sqrt[3]{\frac{3}{4 \pi n}}$$
which corresponds to the radius of a sphere having per-particle volume $1/n$. The cube definition is greater by a factor of approximately 1.61, so one has to exercise care if an article fails to define the parameter exactly. On the other hand, it is often used in qualitative statements where such a numeric factor is either irrelevant or plays an insignificant role, e.g.

- "a potential energy ... is proportional to some power n of the inter-particle distance r" (Virial theorem)
- "the inter-particle distance is much larger than the thermal de Broglie wavelength" (Kinetic theory)

== Ideal gas ==
=== Nearest neighbor distribution ===
PDF of the NN distances in an ideal gas.

We want to calculate probability distribution function of distance to the nearest neighbor (NN) particle. (The problem was first considered by Paul Hertz; for a modern derivation see, e.g.,.) Let us assume $N$ particles inside a sphere having volume $V$, so that $n = N/V$. Note that since the particles in the ideal gas are non-interacting, the probability of finding a particle at a certain distance from another particle is the same as the probability of finding a particle at the same distance from any other point; we shall use the center of the sphere.

An NN particle at a distance $r$ means exactly one of the $N$ particles resides at that distance while the rest $N - 1$ particles are at larger distances, i.e., they are somewhere outside the sphere with radius $r$.

The probability to find a particle at the distance from the origin between $r$ and $r + dr$ is $(4 \pi r^2/V) dr$, plus we have $N$ ways to choose which particle, while the probability to find a particle outside that sphere is $1 - 4\pi r^3/3V$. The sought-for expression is then

$$P_N(r)dr = 4 \pi r^2 dr\frac{N}{V}\left(1 - \frac{4\pi}{3}r^3/V \right)^{N - 1} =
\frac{3}{ a}\left(\frac{r}{a}\right)^2 dr \left(1 - \left(\frac{r}{a}\right)^3 \frac{1}{N} \right)^{N - 1}\,$$

where we substituted

$$\frac{1}{V} = \frac{3}{4 \pi N a^{3}}.$$

Note that $a$ is the Wigner-Seitz radius. Finally, taking the $N \rightarrow \infty$ limit and using $\lim_{x \rightarrow \infty}\left(1 + \frac{1}{x}\right)^x = e$, we obtain

$$P(r) = \frac{3}{a}\left(\frac{r}{a}\right)^2 e^{-(r/a)^3}\,.$$

One can immediately check that

$$\int_{0}^{\infty}P(r)dr = 1\,.$$

The distribution peaks at

$$r_{\text{peak}} = \left(2/3\right)^{1/3} a \approx 0.874 a\,.$$

=== Mean distance and higher moments ===
$$\langle r^k \rangle = \int_{0}^{\infty}P(r) r^k dr = 3 a^k\int_{0}^{\infty}x^{k+2}e^{-x^3}dx\,,$$

or, using the $t = x^3$ substitution,

$$\langle r^k \rangle = a^k \int_{0}^{\infty}t^{k/3}e^{-t}dt = a^k \Gamma(1 + \frac{k}{3})\,,$$

where $\Gamma$ is the gamma function. Thus,

$$\langle r^k \rangle = a^k \Gamma(1 + \frac{k}{3})\,.$$

In particular,

$$\langle r \rangle = a \Gamma(\frac{4}{3}) = \frac{a}{3} \Gamma(\frac{1}{3}) \approx 0.893 a\,.$$

== See also ==
- Wigner–Seitz radius
