= Work hardening =

Strengthening a material through plastic deformation

A phenomenological uniaxial stress–strain curve showing typical work hardening plastic behavior of materials in uniaxial compression. For work hardening materials the yield stress increases with increasing plastic deformation. The strain can be decomposed into a recoverable elastic strain (ε_{e}) and an inelastic strain (ε_{p}). The stress at initial yield is σ_{0}.

Work hardening, also known as strain hardening, is the process by which a material's load-bearing capacity (strength) increases during plastic (permanent) deformation. This characteristic is what sets ductile materials apart from brittle materials. Work hardening may be desirable, undesirable, or inconsequential, depending on the application.

This strengthening occurs because of dislocation movements and dislocation generation within the crystal structure of the material. Many non-brittle metals with a reasonably high melting point and several polymers can be strengthened in this fashion. Alloys not amenable to heat treatment, including low-carbon steel, are often work-hardened. Some materials cannot be work-hardened at low temperatures, such as indium, but others can be strengthened only via work hardening, such as pure copper and aluminum.

== Undesirable work hardening ==
An example of undesirable work hardening is during machining when early passes of a cutter inadvertently work-harden the workpiece surface, causing damage to the cutter during the later passes. Certain alloys are more prone to this than others; superalloys such as Inconel require materials science machining strategies that take it into account.

For metal objects designed to flex, such as springs, specialized alloys are usually employed in order to avoid work hardening (a result of plastic deformation) and metal fatigue, with specific heat treatments required to obtain the necessary characteristics.

== Intentional work hardening ==
An example of desirable work hardening is that which occurs in metalworking processes that intentionally induce plastic deformation to enact a shape change. These processes are known as cold working or cold forming processes. They are characterized by shaping the workpiece at a temperature below its recrystallization temperature, usually at ambient temperature. Cold forming techniques are usually classified into four major groups: squeezing, bending, drawing, and shearing. Applications include the heading of bolts and cap screws and the finishing of cold rolled steel. In cold forming, metal is formed at high speed and high pressure using tool steel or carbide dies. The cold working of the metal increases the hardness, yield strength, and tensile strength.

== Theory ==
Before work hardening, the lattice of the material exhibits a regular, nearly defect-free pattern (almost no dislocations). The defect-free lattice can be created or restored at any time by annealing. As the material is work hardened it becomes increasingly saturated with new dislocations, and more dislocations are prevented from nucleating (a resistance to dislocation-formation develops). This resistance to dislocation-formation manifests itself as a resistance to plastic deformation; hence, the observed strengthening.

In metallic crystals, this is a reversible process and is usually carried out on a microscopic scale by defects called dislocations, which are created by fluctuations in local stress fields within the material culminating in a lattice rearrangement as the dislocations propagate through the lattice. At normal temperatures the dislocations are not annihilated by annealing. Instead, the dislocations accumulate, interact with one another, and serve as pinning points or obstacles that significantly impede their motion. This leads to an increase in the yield strength of the material and a subsequent decrease in ductility.

Such deformation increases the concentration of dislocations which may subsequently form low-angle grain boundaries surrounding sub-grains. Cold working generally results in a higher yield strength as a result of the increased number of dislocations and the Hall–Petch effect of the sub-grains, and a decrease in ductility. The effects of cold working may be reversed by annealing the material at high temperatures where recovery and recrystallization reduce the dislocation density.

A material's work hardenability can be predicted by analyzing a stress–strain curve, or studied in context by performing hardness tests before and after a process.

=== Elastic and plastic deformation ===
Work hardening is a consequence of plastic deformation, a permanent change in shape. This is distinct from elastic deformation, which is reversible. Most materials do not exhibit only one or the other, but rather a combination of the two. The following discussion mostly applies to metals, especially steels, which are well studied. Work hardening occurs most notably for ductile materials such as metals. Ductility is the ability of a material to undergo plastic deformations before fracture (for example, bending a steel rod until it finally breaks).

The tensile test is widely used to study deformation mechanisms. This is because under compression, most materials will experience trivial (lattice mismatch) and non-trivial (buckling) events before plastic deformation or fracture occur. Hence the intermediate processes that occur to the material under uniaxial compression before the incidence of plastic deformation make the compressive test fraught with difficulties.

A material generally deforms elastically under the influence of small forces; the material returns quickly to its original shape when the deforming force is removed. This phenomenon is called elastic deformation. This behavior in materials is described by Hooke's law. Materials behave elastically until the deforming force increases beyond the elastic limit, which is also known as the yield stress. At that point, the material is permanently deformed and fails to return to its original shape when the force is removed. This phenomenon is called plastic deformation. For example, if one stretches a coil spring up to a certain point, it will return to its original shape, but once it is stretched beyond the elastic limit, it will remain deformed and won't return to its original state.

Elastic deformation stretches the bonds between atoms away from their equilibrium radius of separation, without applying enough energy to break the inter-atomic bonds. Plastic deformation, on the other hand, breaks inter-atomic bonds, and therefore involves the rearrangement of atoms in a solid material.

=== Dislocations and lattice strain fields ===
In materials science parlance, dislocations are defined as line defects in a material's crystal structure. The bonds surrounding the dislocation are already elastically strained by the defect compared to the bonds between the constituents of the regular crystal lattice. Therefore, these bonds break at relatively lower stresses, leading to plastic deformation.

The strained bonds around a dislocation are characterized by lattice strain fields. For example, there are compressively strained bonds directly next to an edge dislocation and strained in tension bonds beyond the end of an edge dislocation. These form compressive strain fields and tensile strain fields, respectively. Strain fields are analogous to electric fields in certain ways. Specifically, the strain fields of dislocations obey similar laws of attraction and repulsion; in order to reduce overall strain, compressive strains are attracted to tensile strains, and vice versa.

The visible (macroscopic) results of plastic deformation are the result of microscopic dislocation motion. For example, the stretching of a steel rod in a tensile tester is accommodated through dislocation motion on the atomic scale.

=== Increase of dislocations and work hardening ===
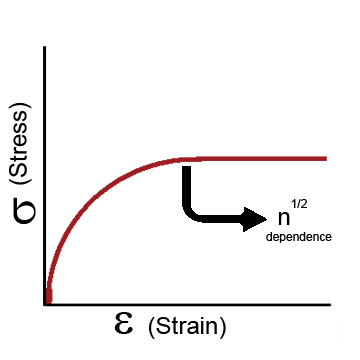
Figure 1: The yield stress of an ordered material depends on the square root of the number of dislocations present.

Increase in the number of dislocations is a quantification of work hardening. Plastic deformation occurs as a consequence of work being done on a material; energy is added to the material. In addition, the energy is almost always applied fast enough and in large enough magnitude to not only move existing dislocations, but also to produce a great number of new dislocations by jarring or working the material sufficiently enough. New dislocations are generated in proximity to a Frank–Read source.

Yield strength is increased in a cold-worked material. Using lattice strain fields, it can be shown that an environment filled with dislocations will hinder the movement of any one dislocation. Because dislocation motion is hindered, plastic deformation cannot occur at normal stresses. Upon application of stresses just beyond the yield strength of the non-cold-worked material, a cold-worked material will continue to deform using the only mechanism available: elastic deformation, the regular scheme of stretching or compressing of electrical bonds (without dislocation motion) continues to occur, and the modulus of elasticity is unchanged. Eventually the stress is great enough to overcome the strain-field interactions and plastic deformation resumes.

However, ductility of a work-hardened material is decreased. Ductility is the extent to which a material can undergo plastic deformation, that is, it is how far a material can be plastically deformed before fracture. A cold-worked material is, in effect, a normal (brittle) material that has already been extended through part of its allowed plastic deformation. If dislocation motion and plastic deformation have been hindered enough by dislocation accumulation, and stretching of electronic bonds and elastic deformation have reached their limit, a third mode of deformation occurs: fracture.

=== Quantification of work hardening ===
The shear strength, $\tau$, of a dislocation is dependent on the shear modulus, G, the magnitude of the Burgers vector, b, and the dislocation density, $\rho_\perp$:

$$\tau = \tau_0 + G \alpha b \rho_\perp^{1/2}\$$

where $\tau_0$ is the intrinsic strength of the material with low dislocation density and $\alpha$ is a correction factor specific to the material.

As shown in Figure 1 and the equation above, work hardening has a half root dependency on the number of dislocations. The material exhibits high strength if there are either high levels of dislocations (greater than 10^{14} dislocations per m^{2}) or no dislocations. A moderate number of dislocations (between 10^{7} and 10^{9} dislocations per m^{2}) typically results in low strength.

=== Example ===
For an extreme example, in a tensile test a bar of steel is strained to just before the length at which it usually fractures. The load is released smoothly and the material relieves some of its strain by decreasing in length. The decrease in length is called the elastic recovery, and the result is a work-hardened steel bar. The fraction of length recovered (length recovered/original length) is equal to the yield-stress divided by the modulus of elasticity. (Here we discuss true stress in order to account for the drastic decrease in diameter in this tensile test.) The length recovered after removing a load from a material just before it breaks is equal to the length recovered after removing a load just before it enters plastic deformation.

The work-hardened steel bar has a large enough number of dislocations that the strain field interaction prevents all plastic deformation. Subsequent deformation requires a stress that varies linearly with the strain observed, the slope of the graph of stress vs. strain is the modulus of elasticity, as usual.

The work-hardened steel bar fractures when the applied stress exceeds the usual fracture stress and the strain exceeds usual fracture strain. This may be considered to be the elastic limit and the yield stress is now equal to the fracture toughness, which is much higher than a non-work-hardened steel yield stress.

The amount of plastic deformation possible is zero, which is less than the amount of plastic deformation possible for a non-work-hardened material. Thus, the ductility of the cold-worked bar is reduced.

Substantial and prolonged cavitation can also produce strain hardening.

== Empirical relations ==
There are two common mathematical descriptions of the work hardening phenomenon. Hollomon's equation is a power law relationship between the stress and the amount of plastic strain:

$$\sigma = K \epsilon_p ^n \,\!$$

where σ is the stress, K is the strength index or strength coefficient, ε_{p} is the plastic strain and n is the strain hardening exponent. Ludwik's equation is similar but includes the yield stress:

$$\sigma = \sigma_y + K \epsilon_p^n \,\!$$

If a material has been subjected to prior deformation (at low temperature) then the yield stress will be increased by a factor depending on the amount of prior plastic strain ε_{0}:

$$\sigma = \sigma_y + K (\epsilon_0 + \epsilon_p)^n \,\!$$

The constant K is structure dependent and is influenced by processing while n is a material property normally lying in the range 0.2–0.5. The strain hardening index can be described by:

$$n = \frac{d \log(\sigma)}{d \log(\epsilon)} = \frac{\epsilon}{\sigma}\frac{d \sigma}{d \epsilon} \,\!$$

This equation can be evaluated from the slope of a log(σ) – log(ε) plot. Rearranging allows a determination of the rate of strain hardening at a given stress and strain:

$$\frac{d \sigma}{d \epsilon} = n \frac{\sigma}{\epsilon} \,\!$$

== Work hardening in specific materials ==
=== Steel ===
Steel is an important engineering material, used in many applications. Steel may be work hardened by deformation at low temperature, called cold working. Typically, an increase in cold work results in a decrease in the strain hardening exponent. Similarly, high strength steels tend to exhibit a lower strain hardening exponent.

=== Copper ===
Copper was the first metal in common use for tools and containers since it is one of the few metals available in non-oxidized form, not requiring the smelting of an ore. Copper is easily softened by heating and then cooling (it does not harden by quenching, e.g., quenching in cool water). In this annealed state it may then be hammered, stretched and otherwise formed, progressing toward the desired final shape but becoming harder and less ductile as work progresses. If work continues beyond a certain hardness the metal will tend to fracture when worked and so it may be re-annealed periodically as shaping continues. Annealing is stopped when the workpiece is near its final desired shape, and so the final product will have a desired strength and hardness. The technique of repoussé exploits these properties of copper, enabling the construction of durable jewelry articles and sculptures (such as the Statue of Liberty).

=== Gold and other precious metals ===
Much gold and silver jewelry is produced by casting, with little or no cold working; which, depending on the alloy grade, may leave the metal relatively soft and bendable. However, a jeweler may intentionally use work hardening to strengthen wearable objects that are exposed to stress, such as rings.

=== Aluminum ===
Items made from aluminum and its alloys must be carefully designed to minimize or evenly distribute flexure, which can lead to work hardening and, in turn, stress cracking, possibly causing catastrophic failure. For this reason modern aluminum aircraft will have an imposed working lifetime (dependent upon the type of loads encountered), after which the aircraft must be retired.
