= Burgers vector =

Vector representing lattice distortion due to dislocations in a crystal

In materials science, the Burgers vector, named after Dutch physicist Jan Burgers, is a vector, often denoted as b, that represents the magnitude and direction of the lattice distortion resulting from a dislocation in a crystal lattice.

== Concepts ==
Burgers vector in an edge dislocation (left) and in a screw dislocation (right). The edge dislocation can be imagined as the introduction of a half plane (gray boxes) that does not fit the crystal symmetry. The screw dislocation can be imagined as cut and shear operation along a half plane.

The vector's magnitude and direction is best understood when the dislocation-bearing crystal structure is first visualized without the dislocation, that is, the perfect crystal structure. In this perfect crystal structure, a rectangle whose lengths and widths are integer multiples of a (the unit cell edge length) is drawn encompassing the site of the dislocation's origin. Once this encompassing rectangle is drawn, the dislocation can be introduced. This dislocation will have the effect of deforming, not only the perfect crystal structure, but the rectangle as well. The rectangle could have one of its sides disjointed from the perpendicular side, severing the connection of the length and width line segments of the rectangle at one of the rectangle's corners, and displacing each line segment from each other. What was once a rectangle before the dislocation was introduced is now an open geometric figure, whose opening defines the direction and magnitude of the Burgers vector. Specifically, the breadth of the opening defines the magnitude of the Burgers vector, and, when a set of fixed coordinates is introduced, an angle between the termini of the dislocated rectangle's length line segment and width line segment may be specified.

When calculating the Burgers vector practically, one may draw a rectangular clockwise circuit (Burgers circuit) from a starting point to enclose the dislocation. The Burgers vector will be the vector to complete the circuit, i.e., from the start to the end of the circuit.

One can also use a counterclockwise Burgers circuit from a starting point to enclose the dislocation. The Burgers vector will instead be from the end to the start of the circuit (see picture above).

The direction of the vector depends on the plane of dislocation, which is usually on one of the closest-packed crystallographic planes. The magnitude is usually represented by the equation (For BCC and FCC lattices only):

$$\|\mathbf{b}\|\ = (a/2)\sqrt{h^2+k^2+l^2}$$

where a is the unit cell edge length of the crystal, $\|\mathbf{b}\|$ is the magnitude of the Burgers vector, and h, k, and l are the components of the Burgers vector, $\mathbf b = \tfrac{a}{2} \langle h k l \rangle ;$ the coefficient $\tfrac{a}{2}$ is because in BCC and FCC lattices, the shortest lattice vectors could be as expressed $\tfrac{a}{2} \langle h k l \rangle .$ Comparatively, for simple cubic lattices, $\mathbf b = a \langle h k l \rangle$ and hence the magnitude is represented by

$$\|\mathbf{b}\|\ = a\sqrt{h^2+k^2+l^2}$$

Generally, the Burgers vector of a dislocation is defined by performing a line integral over the distortion field around the dislocation line

$$b_i = \oint_{L}w_{ij}d{x_j} = \oint_{L}\frac{\partial u_i}{\partial x_j}d{x_j}$$

where the integration path L is a Burgers circuit around the dislocation line, u_{i} is the displacement field, and $w_{ij}= \tfrac{\partial u_i}{\partial x_j}$ is the distortion field.

In most metallic materials, the magnitude of the Burgers vector for a dislocation is of a magnitude equal to the interatomic spacing of the material, since a single dislocation will offset the crystal lattice by one close-packed crystallographic spacing unit.

In edge dislocations, the Burgers vector and dislocation line are perpendicular to one another. In screw dislocations, they are parallel.

The Burgers vector is significant in determining the yield strength of a material by affecting solute hardening, precipitation hardening and work hardening. The Burgers vector plays an important role in determining the direction of dislocation line.

== See also ==
- Frank–Read source
- Dislocations
