= Angus J. Wilkinson =

British materials scientist

- Born: Spexhall, Suffolk
- Education: University of Bristol
- Alma mater: University of Bristol (BSc, PhD)
- Known for: HR-EBSD
- Scientific career
- Fields: Materials science Micromechanics; EBSD
- Institutions: University of Oxford
- Thesis: Micro-mechanics of continuous fibre metal matrix composites (1991)
- Notable students: Ben Britton
- Website: https://omg.web.ox.ac.uk/

Angus J. Wilkinson is a professor of materials science based at the Department of Materials, University of Oxford. He is a specialist in micromechanics of materials and electron microscopy.

== Biography ==
Wilkinson is from Spexhall, Suffolk. He obtained a bachelor's degree in chemical physics and PhD in engineering from the University of Bristol. He moved to Department of Materials, University of Oxford as postdoctoral researcher in early 1990s.

Wilkinson research focuses on materials science, particularly in the areas of electron backscatter diffraction (EBSD), deformation mechanisms, and microstructural characterisation of materials. His research explores plasticity, strain localisation, and the mechanical behaviour of materials at the microscale, often using advanced microscopy techniques to study stress and deformation in metals and alloys. Wilkinson developed the HR-EBSD method for mapping strain and dislocation density at high spatial resolution at the micron scale.

Wilkinson assists in overseeing the MicroMechanics group at the Department of Materials, University of Oxford, while focusing on the fundamentals of material deformation. Throughout his career, Wilkinson has held various leadership roles within the Department of Materials at Oxford. He served as deputy head of the department from 2018 to 2019 and co-headed the department with Peter Nellist from 2020 to 2021, and with Hazel E. Assender from 2021 to 2022.

Wilkinson actively comments on PubPeer to highlight research integrity issues, such as citation fraud, image manipulation, and data inconsistencies. Wilkinson flagged concerns about manipulated images and data irregularities in Filippo Berto's publications, which led to numerous retractions and helped prompt the Norwegian University of Science and Technology committee to open an investigation into Berto's work.
