= Emma Kendrick =

Emma Kendrick may refer to:

- Emma Eleonora Kendrick (1788–1871), British miniature-painter
- Emma Kendrick (academic), professor of energy materials
