= GND =

GND may refer to:

- Gabriel Nadeau-Dubois, a politician in Quebec
- Gemeinsame Normdatei (Integrated Authority File)
- Geometrically necessary dislocations
- Graduated neutral density filter
- Green New Deal
- Ground (electricity)
- Los Angeles Police Department Gang and Narcotics Division
- Maurice Bishop International Airport in Grenada
- Zulgo-Gemzek language, spoken in Cameroon
