= Honorary title (academic) =

Title in academia conferred on persons in recognition of contributions

An honorary title in academia may be conferred on a non-employee who is contributing to the work of a university. This practice exists, with some variations, in multiple countries. Examples of such titles include honorary professor, honorary reader, honorary lecturer, and honorary fellow.

== Honorary professor ==
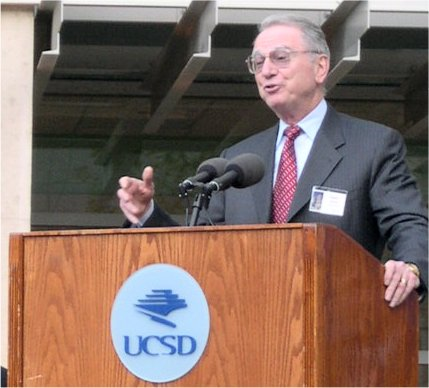
Irwin Jacobs received an honorary distinguished chair professorship from National Tsing Hua University, Taiwan in 2013

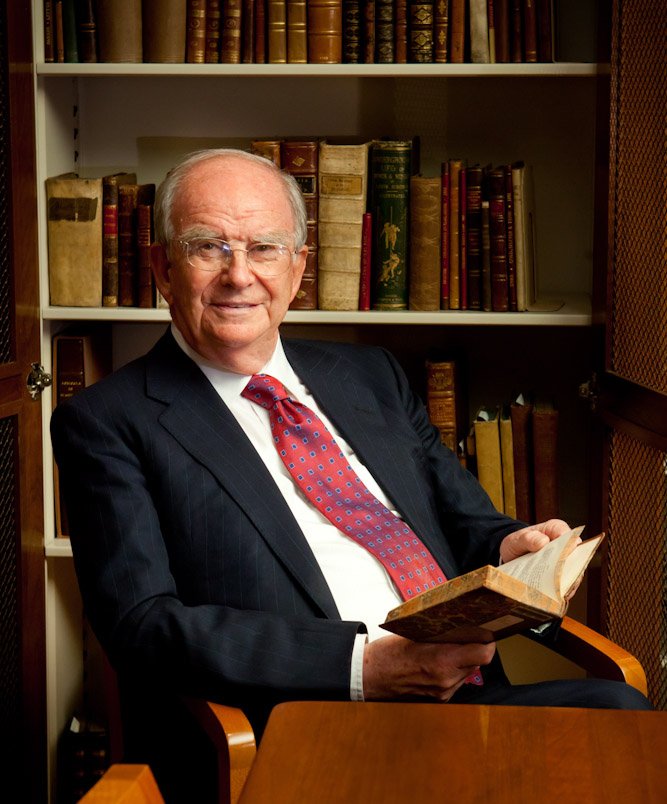
Sir John Meurig Thomas received an honorary distinguished professorship from Osaka Prefecture University, Japan in 2006

Many UK universities award honorary professorships as unpaid, non-staff roles for other academics to collaborate with their academic staff, with an expectation that they will contribute to the work of the university. Appointments are normally made for a fixed period of time (usually three years) and renewal is possible.

People may wish be appointed to honorary positions at ranks lower than professor, such as honorary readers and honorary lecturer. Sometimes in one of that positions can be promoted to a higher honorary rank on recommendation by the internal university staff and department. Once approved at the university level, the title is then changed.

In Taiwan, more titles are used to recognise different levels of individuals. They are (in descending order of hierarchy):

- Honorary distinguished chair professor
- Honorary chair professor
- Honorary distinguished professor
- Honorary professor
- Honorary associate professor
- Honorary assistant professor

In China, top universities like Fudan University, Tsinghua University and Peking University have awarded honorary professorships. Recent recipients include Peter Bruce from Oxford, Reinhart Poprawe from Aachen Germany, Thomas Sargent and Anwar Ibrahim.

In Australia, Australian Catholic University, University of Queensland, RMIT, University of Western Australia, University of Wollongong, University of Canberra and Macquarie University all allow the appointment of honorary professors.

In New Zealand, University of Otago, University of Waikato, and University of Auckland also have provisions for the appointment of honorary professors. Recently, Richard Taylor was appointed honorary professor at Massey University. Mike Murphy of the Mitochondrial Biology Unit at University of Cambridge was appointed to honorary professor at University of Otago in 2016.

In Denmark, the honorary professor title is conferred in recognition of a person's special contribution to the subject area associated with faculty's activities. Honorary professors are expected to:

- Participate in research partnerships
- Give lectures
- Participate in PhD co-supervision or PhD examination committee

Although honorary professors are not paid a salary, the following expenses are usually compensated:

- Travel and accommodation during visits to university
- Daily expenses such as cost of meals
- A lecture fee

Aarhus University is an example university in Denmark that confers honorary professorships.

== Honorary fellow ==
In some UK universities, such as Imperial College London, the title of honorary fellow may be a time-limited title awarded to people that the university wishes to recognise and collaborate with, in a similar manner to an honorary professorships.

Alternatively, honorary fellowships may be a permanent university honour similar to an honorary degree, such as at University College London, Cardiff University, the London School of Economics, and Queen Mary University of London. As with honorary degrees, these honorary fellowships are normally conferred at a graduation ceremony. Such honours may sometimes be simply termed fellowships rather than honorary fellowships, such as the Fellowship of King's College.

The University of Hong Kong also awards honorary fellowships and a recent award was made to Harry Shum from Microsoft Corporation.

Various professional bodies, such as the Royal Institute of British Architects and IET UK also have honorary fellowships.

== Visiting appointments ==
Visiting appointments are often confused with honorary academic titles. A visiting professor or reader or senior lecturer or lecturer is someone who has taken time off their primary institution of employment to visit and collaborate with staff from another university. Hence, the visiting appointment is usually for a short period of time, ranging from three months up to a year. This is not the same as an honorary appointment held in UK universities.

However, in Germany, visiting lecturers and private lecturers can be conferred the titles of Honorarprofessor or Außerplanmäßiger professor respectively after several semesters of successful teaching.

== Benefits ==
In addition to the honour and recognition, an honorary title sometimes permits non-employees to enjoy the privileges available to regular staff members, such as access to facilities and libraries, temporary stay in university housing, entitlement to a university business card, an email account, and to receive a parking permit.
