= The Faraday Institution =

Nonprofit organization in Didcot, United Kingdom

- Founded: 12 September 2017
- Founder: Ryan Bayliss; Peter Bruce; David Greenwood; Stephen Heidari-Robinson
- Type: Research institute
- Registration no.: England and Wales: 10959095
- Purpose: Electrochemical Energy storage, Electric battery research
- Location: Harwell Science and Innovation Campus
- Coordinates: 51.579344°N 1.307642°W
- CEO: Martin Freer
- Website: faraday.ac.uk//

The Faraday Institution is the United Kingdom's research institute aiming to advance battery science and technology. It was established in 2017 as part of the UK's wider Faraday Battery Challenge. It states its mission as having four key areas: "electrochemical energy storage research, skills development, market analysis and early-stage commercialisation". The Institution is headquartered at the Harwell Science and Innovation Campus near Oxford. It is a limited company and is a registered charity with an independent board of trustees.

In June 2025, the Department for Business and Trade announced £452 million for the Battery Innovation Programme (the successor to the Faraday Battery Challenge), delivered from April 2026 to March 2030, with the Faraday Institution as the delivery partner for academic research and development.

== Name ==
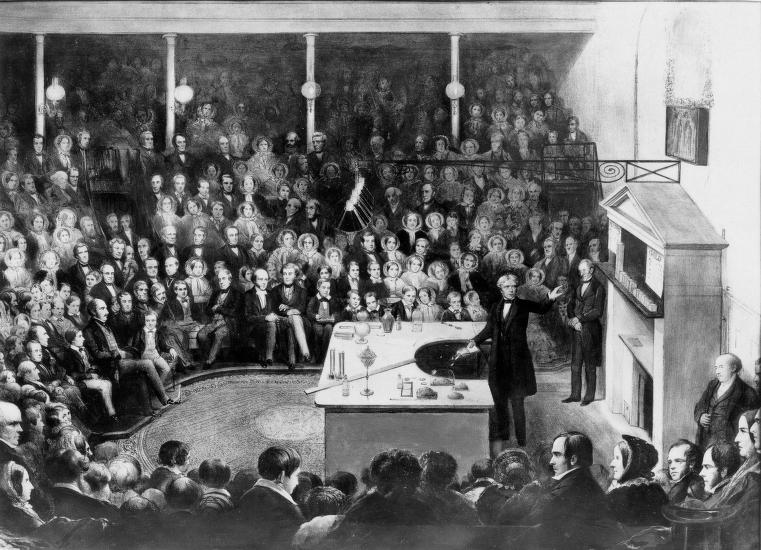
Faraday delivering a Christmas Lecture at the Royal Institution in 1856.

The Faraday Institution is named after Michael Faraday, an English scientist who contributed to the basic understanding of electromagnetism and electrochemistry. He popularised the now common battery terminology "anode", "cathode", "electrode" and "ion". Faraday lectured on education at the Royal Institution in 1854 and appeared before a Public Schools Commission to give his views on education in Great Britain. Between 1827 and 1860 at the Royal Institution, Faraday presented nineteen Christmas lectures for young people. The Royal Institution Christmas Lectures series continues today, broadcast on the BBC.

Following this tradition, the Faraday Institution runs education and public engagement activities. In 2019, it launched a public discussion series on batteries with the Royal Institution and continued the programme from 2020 through 2024.

== Research programmes ==
The Faraday Institution currently focuses on research in lithium-ion batteries, "beyond" lithium-ion battery technologies and energy storage for emerging economies. Research is conducted in multidisciplinary teams with expertise that ranges across chemical engineering, chemistry, data and computer science, mechanical engineering, electrical engineering, law, materials science, maths and physics.

=== Lithium ion ===
- Battery degradation
- Multi-scale modelling
- Battery recycling and reuse
- Electrode manufacturing
- Cathode materials
- Battery safety

=== Beyond Lithium ion ===
- Solid-state batteries
- Sodium-ion batteries
- Lithium-sulfur batteries

=== Batteries for Emerging Economies ===
With funding from the FCDO, in 2020 the Faraday Institution commenced research on battery technologies for use in developing countries and emerging economies.

- Soluble lead flow batteries
- Graphite polysulphide single liquid flow batteries

== Founding universities and participating universities ==
The Faraday Institution was founded by seven universities:

- Imperial College London
- Newcastle University
- University College London
- University of Cambridge
- University of Oxford
- University of Southampton
- University of Warwick

The Faraday Institution's research projects are competitive and open to all academic battery researchers and research groups in the UK.

In 2020, university participants included the following:

- Imperial College London
- Cardiff University
- Coventry University
- Lancaster University
- Newcastle University
- University College London
- University of Cambridge
- University of Oxford
- University of Southampton
- University of Warwick
- University of Bath
- University of Birmingham
- University of Cambridge
- University of Edinburgh
- University of Leicester
- University of Liverpool
- University of Manchester
- University of Nottingham
- University of Oxford
- University of Portsmouth
- University of Sheffield
- University of Southampton
- University of St. Andrews
- University of Surrey
- University of Warwick

== Impacts on policy ==
The Faraday Institution publishes white papers and reports to inform both government and industry on energy storage science, technology, economics, supply chains and employment. Its report on UK battery demand was used to evidence the requirement for UK based automotive battery gigafactories and the need for the Automotive Transformation Fund (ATF) to support establishing them.

=== Battery Sustainability, Recycling and Reuse ===
The Faraday Institution participates in international efforts on sustainability and the recycling and reuse of lithium-ion batteries in emerging economies and developing countries. An effort with NREL as part of the World Bank Energy Storage Partnership led to the 2020 publication of "Global Overview of Energy Storage Performance Test Protocols" that provides support and knowledge across the developing world on opportunities and technologies for energy storage in the electric sector. It contributed to the 2020 study "Reuse and Recycling: Environmental Sustainability of Lithium-Ion Battery Energy Storage Systems", which offers an assessment of the role developing countries can play in this area.

It is a member of the World Economic Forum Global Battery Alliance, an international consortium focused on a circular economy and sustainable value chain for batteries and contributed to the 2019 report "A Vision for a Sustainable Battery Value Chain in 2030."

== Outreach and education ==
The Faraday Institution maintains outreach and education programmes that extend across STEM, undergraduate attraction, doctoral training and early career professional development to generate trained battery scientists and engineers.

The public has information on opportunities and challenges of energy storage, and future generations of scientists and engineers from all backgrounds to pursue promising STEM careers.the Faraday Institution has engaged delivery partners including the Royal Institution, SEO London, WISE Campaign, The Curiosity Box and the Primary Science Teaching Trust (PSTT).

== Notable scientists associated with the Faraday Institution ==
- Steven Cowley, chair of the Board of Trustees
- Peter Littlewood, Former Chair of the Board of Trustees
- Pamela Thomas, Former Chief Executive Officer
- Sir Peter Bruce, Chief Scientist
- Dame Clare Grey, Principal Investigator
- Saiful Islam, Principal Investigator
- Kristina Edström, Former Trustee
- Emma Kendrick, Principal Investigator
