= Ben Britton =

British materials scientist and engineer

Ben Britton CEng FIMMM
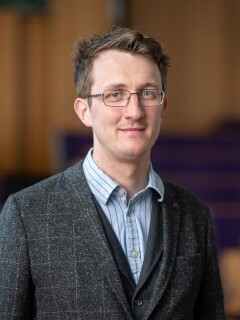
- Britton in 2019 at Imperial College London
- Born: Thomas Benjamin Britton; 18 April 1985 (age 41)
- Other name: BMatB
- Education: Magdalen College School, Oxford; University of Oxford (BA, DPhil)
- Scientific career
- Fields: Materials science Micromechanics; Deformation; Strain; Electron backscatter diffraction
- Workplaces: The University of British Columbia; Imperial College London
- Thesis: A high resolution electron backscatter diffraction study of titanium and its alloys (2009)
- Doctoral advisor: Angus Wilkinson
- Website: www.expmicromech.com

Thomas Benjamin Britton CEng FIMMM (born 18 April 1985) is a British materials scientist, engineer and Associate Professor at The University of British Columbia. His research interests are in micromechanics, deformation, strain and electron backscatter diffraction (EBSD). In 2014 he was awarded the Silver Medal of the Institute of Materials, Minerals and Mining (IOM3), a society of which he then became a Fellow in 2016.

== Early life and education ==
Britton grew up in Oxford and was privately educated at Magdalen College School, Oxford. He graduated with a Master of Engineering (MEng) in materials science from the Department of Materials, University of Oxford in 2007 where he was a student of St Catherine's College, Oxford. In 2010, he completed a Doctor of Philosophy degree in materials science, for electron backscatter diffraction (EBSD) research of titanium and its alloys supervised by Angus Wilkinson.

== Research and career ==
After completing his PhD, Britton spent two years in Oxford as a postdoctoral research associate studying materials for fission and fusion power. He received a fellowship in nuclear research in the faculty of engineering at Imperial College London in 2012. In 2015, he was appointed a lecturer in the centre for nuclear engineering at Imperial supported by a Royal Academy of Engineering fellowship establishing the "better understanding of materials to make safer reactors". From 2017, Britton was a senior lecturer in materials science at the Centre for Nuclear Engineering. He was the course director of Imperial's Master of Science (MSc) program in advanced nuclear engineering and deputy director of the Centre for Nuclear Engineering.

In 2021, Britton was appointed as an associate professor in the department of Materials Engineering at The University of British Columbia. He holds a visiting readership at Imperial College London, as well as an academic visiting scholar at the University of Oxford.

Britton develops high resolution microscopy techniques, including forescatter electron imaging for topographic and phase contrast.

=== Public engagement ===
Britton has led outreach and engagement activity aimed at changing public perception about nuclear energy, and regularly blogs about early career academic life. He has appeared on the podcast Scientists Not the Science. As of 2017 he serves on the executive committee of Science is Vital, a grassroots campaign formed in 2010 to combat threats to the UK's research and development (R&D) budget. He is a trustee of the charity Pride in STEM, through which he was nominated for the Gay Times honours in 2017. He spoke at the Institute of Physics (IOP) pride of physics celebration in August 2018. In 2018, he was interviewed for Nature's podcast Working Scientist, where he spoke about the advantages of using online platforms that allowed academics to collaborate and exchange ideas more easily.

In his role as deputy director of Imperial's centre for nuclear engineering, Britton was a co-signatory of an open letter to Emmanuel Macron, urging the then-recently elected President of France to keep the nation's nuclear power plants open in order to keep carbon emissions low. He has also contributed written evidence to the House of Lords about nuclear technology.

Britton has also campaigned for the removal of Imperial College's newly imposed application fee for its postgraduate programmes, citing the policy's detriments against underprivileged applicants. As at the time of reporting, the university has not removed its postgraduate programme application fee policy.

=== Awards and honours ===
In 2014 Britton was awarded the IOM3 Silver Medal (Outstanding contribution to materials science, engineering and technology by individual under 30). In 2016 he won one of five awards for the engineers trust's "Young Engineer" of the year, being described by the Royal Academy of Engineering as one of the UK's "future engineering leaders". In 2014 he was elected a Fellow of the Institute of Materials, Minerals and Mining (FIMMM).

=== Selected publications ===
- Strains, planes, and EBSD in materials science.
- The effect of crystal orientation on the indentation response of commercially pure titanium: experiments and simulations.
- Controlling the orientation, edge geometry, and thickness of chemical vapor deposition graphene.
- High resolution electron backscatter diffraction measurements of elastic strain variations in the presence of larger lattice rotations.
- Measurement of residual elastic strain and lattice rotations with high resolution electron backscatter diffraction.
- Stress fields and geometrically necessary dislocation density distributions near the head of a blocked slip band
- On the mechanistic basis of deformation at the microscale in hexagonal close-packed metals
