= Nicole Grobert =

British-German materials chemist

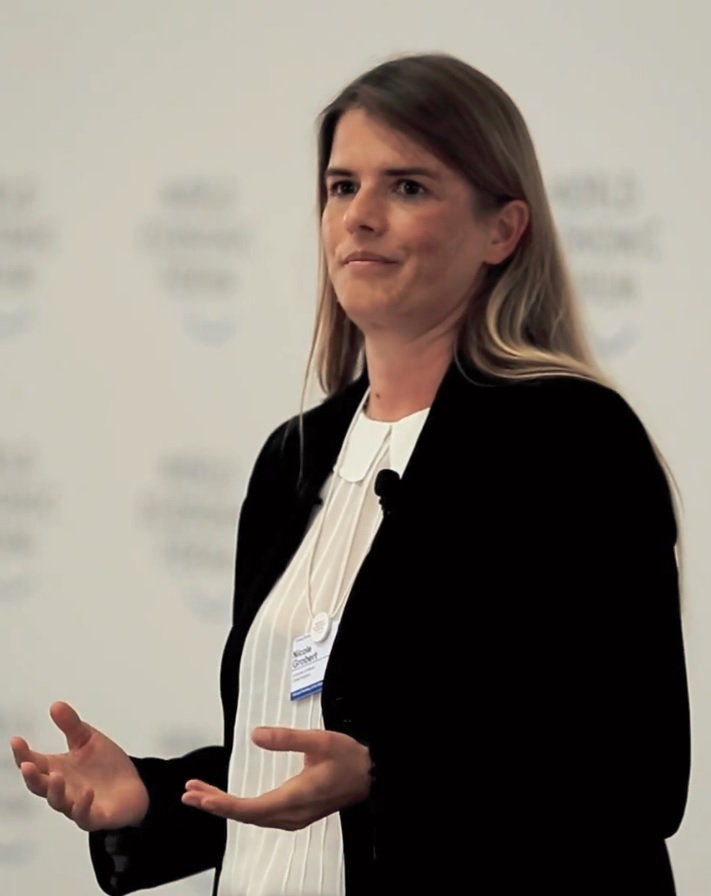
- Nicole Grobert speaking at the World Economic Forum IdeasLab 2013
- Born: Germany
- Education: University of Ulm; University of Sussex
- Scientific career
- Fields: material science; materials chemistry; nanoscience; nanotechnologies
- Workplaces: University of Oxford

Nicole Grobert FRSC FYAE is a German-British materials chemist. She is a professor of nanomaterials at the Department of Materials at the University of Oxford, fellow of Corpus Christi College, Oxford, and a Royal Society industry fellow at Williams Advanced Engineering.

== Career ==
Grobert studied chemistry at the University of Ulm. She conducted her PhD under the supervision of Sir Harry Kroto FRS NL and Dr David Walton FRSC and received her PhD in physical chemistry for her thesis on Novel Carbon Nanomaterials from the University of Sussex in 2001 for which she was awarded the Carbon Pergamon Prize in the same year. Following a one-year post-doc in the same lab and group leader post at the Max-Planck-Institute for Metals Research in Stuttgart, she was awarded the Royal Society Dorothy Hodgkin Fellowship in 2002, the Royal Society University Research Fellowship in 2006, and the Royal Society Industry Fellowship in 2016.

In 2010, Grobert was promoted to professor of nanomaterials and made permanent at the Department of Materials at the University of Oxford. She is also a fellow at Corpus Christi College, Oxford, and a visiting professor at the BioNano Electronics Research Centre at Toyo University, Japan. Prior to her current post at Oxford, she was offered a chair at a Russell Group University and a chair (Première Classe) and directorship at a French university and research institute.

From 2018 to 2025, Grobert was a member and later the chair of the European Commission's Group of Chief Scientific Advisors.

== Research ==
As a professor of nanomaterials, Grobert her research is focused on the "synthesis, processing, and characterisation of novel carbon and non-carbon based nanomaterials, including nanoparticles, nanotubes, nanorods, graphene and other 2D nanomaterials". In collaboration with international industries, her research is geared towards engineering multifunctional hierarchical nanostructures for their application in the healthcare, the energy sectors, and in structural applications. In 2016, she led the theme Smart Materials of the International Consortium of Nanotechnologies. Grobert's work is highly cited and has been published in over 150 articles and six patents.

== Science policy, committees, and panels ==
Grobert is the chair of the European Commission's Group of Chief Scientific Advisors. She has also served on a number of high-level advisory committees including:

- No 10 Downing Street Round Table on Advanced Materials
- The UK Ministerial Nanotechnology Committee
- DEFRA meetings on Nanotechnology

She spoke twice at The House of Lords Science and Technology Select Committee and she has been vice-president of the British Carbon Group. Moreover, she is a member the Royal Society and the Royal Academy of Engineering working group on nanotechnology commissioned by the UK government in July 2003. which produced one of the first reports on the opportunities and uncertainties of the Nanosciences and Nanotechnologies in 2004.

Moreover, Grobert is a founding member of the Young Academy of Europe - an international, non-governmental association of individual scientists and scholars who are experts and leaders in their respective fields, as recognised by their peers and in 2015 she was elected to the chair of the academy. In her role as chair of the YAE she also represented the YAE at the Academia Europaea Board. Through the AE and SAPEA, the Young Academy of Europe directly engages with Science Policy and the Science Advice Mechanism at the European Level. In 2017, she has been elected to the advisory board of the Young Academy of Europe.

Selected research evaluation committees and panels include:

- The Royal Society University Research Fellowship Panel
- The Royal Society Rosalind Franklin Committee
- The Royal Society Newton International Fellowship Selection Committee
- The Royal Society Commonwealth Science Conference Follow-on Grants
- The Royal Society Robert Hooke Committee
- The World Economic Forum Future Technology Pioneers Programme Committee
- The European Commission (FET Panel, Flagship evaluation Panel)
- EPSRC Fellowship Panel
- Board Member of the Scientific Advisory Panel of the Leibniz Institute for New Materials, Saarbruecken, Germany

== Engaging with industry ==
Over the years, as part of her research activities Grobert has also engaged with internationally leading industries. Her work features widely across the world-wide-web on blogs, in videos, and press releases about her research articles have attracted much interest and as a delegation of the Department of Business, Innovation and Skills visited Grobert’s research Laboratory in November 2015 in order to discuss challenges faced in commercialising research outputs and how government policy could help to remove barriers to industrial take-up.

== Public engagement ==
In 2008, Grobert was invited to join the Board of Trustees of the Vega Science Trust - an educational charity, which has made and streams free on the Internet more than 300 Science programmes – 75 of which have been shown on the BBC. To date Nicole has produced two EU sponsored films aimed at encouraging the uptake of science, in particular nano- and materials science, and several other educational clips.

In 2015, as a result of her research, she featured on BBC2 Newsnight and she has given TED-like and Pecha-Kucha 20x20 talks at the World Economic Forum and at meetings organised by internationally leading industries such as Bayer, Deloitte, and Solvay S.A. In addition, she has played a key role in European Science in Society Networks on women in science (WomenInNano, and DIVERSITY) and was one of eleven founding members of the Sci-Generation COST Network. In 2013, Nicole was invited to speak at the Hay Festival chaired by Professor John Sulston FRS NL (and again in 2017). In the following year (2014), she was invited to the SciFoo organised by O'Reilly Media, Digital Science, Nature Publishing Group and Google Inc. In 2017, she presented at the Estonian Presidency Research Policy Conference (European Research Excellence – Impact and Value for Society) in Tallinn in 2017.

== Diversity ==
Since 2006, more than 80 members (post-docs, DPhil, Masters, and visiting students) have been part of Grobert's research team focusing on establishing ‘Growth systematics for the controlled generation of nanostructured materials'.

Her team is an international with group members coming from almost 30 different countries. The gender balance of her team averages to 50% women and men over the years. Close to 100% of her former group members have either stayed in academia (and have become permanent faculty), research institutions or have continued their careers in science-related posts.

== Honors and awards ==
- Nominated Rosalind Franklin Award
- Young Scientist 2013, World Economic Forum Dalian, China
- Selected by the ERC as one of two grantees to present ERC research at the Alpbach Technology Forum
- Winner of EPSRC Sandpit: INSPIRE Robust Biocatalysis for Energy Solutions
- Merit Award, Department of Materials, University of Oxford
- Nominated for Royal Society Kohn Award
- Senior Research Fellow, Corpus Christi College, Oxford
- Future Leader 2008, Science and Technology in Society Forum in Kyoto Japan
- Visiting Professor Bio-Nano Electronics Research Centre Toyo University, Kawagoe, Japan
- Nesta CRUCIBLE Awardee 30 annual Crucible Fellowships are given to promising interdisciplinary scientists working across the UK
- Outstanding individual - a testament to Britain's scientific potential and the dynamism selected by the Royal Society
- Senior Research Fellow Wolfson College, Oxford
- Visiting scientist at the Bio-Nano Electronics Research Centre, Toyo University, Kawagoe, Japan
- International Carbon Pergamon Prize
- Full scholarships for Doctoral studies by The DERA (Defence Evaluation Research Agency, Malvern), the JFCC (Japanese Fine Ceramics Centre) and the School of Chemistry, Physics and Environmental Science, University of Sussex
