= RSC =

RSC may refer to:

== Arts ==
- Royal Shakespeare Company, a British theatre company
- Reduced Shakespeare Company, a touring American acting troupe
- Richmondshire Subscription Concerts, a music society in Richmond, North Yorkshire, England
- Rock Steady Crew, a breakdancing crew and hip hop group from The Bronx, New York City

== Science and technology ==
- Chromatin structure remodeling (RSC) complex, a 17-subunit complex with the capacity to remodel the structure of chromatin
- React Server Components, components that run exclusively on a React system
- Reconfigurable Supercomputing, a method of supercomputing that takes advantage of reconfigurable computing architectures (such as FPGAs)
- Recursive Systematic Convolutional code, a type of convolutional code
- Reed–Solomon code, a non-binary cyclic error-correcting code
- Regular Slotted Container, a common form of corrugated fiberboard box
- Reverse Standards Conversion, a video standards conversion process
- RISC Single Chip, the single chip version of the POWER1 processor
- Ribeyrolles, Sutter and Chauchat, joint designers of an early semi-automatic rifle often referred to as the RSC M1917 or simply RSC

== Places and institutions ==
- Railway Safety Commission, a government agency of the Republic of Ireland
- Religious Sisters of Charity, a Roman Catholic religious order for women
- Religious Studies Center, the research arm of Religious Education at Brigham Young University
- Republican Study Committee, a conservative caucus of the U.S. House of Representatives
- Richard Stockton College, former name of Stockton University, 1993–2015
- Robinsons Summit Center, Skyscraper in Makati, Metro Manila, Philippines
- Roosevelt Study Center, a research institute, conference center, and library on twentieth-century American history located in Middelburg, the Netherlands
- Royal Society of Canada, the senior national, bilingual body of distinguished Canadian scholars, humanists, scientists and artists
- Royal Society of Chemistry, a learned society in the United Kingdom
- Ryde Secondary College, a selective government high school in Sydney, Australia

== Sports ==
- Ralf Schumacher's abbreviation in Formula One
- Red Sun Cycling Team, a Dutch women's elite cycling team
- Referee stopped contest, a result in amateur boxing if an opponent is outclassed, outscored or injured
- Regional Sports Centre, Waterford, Ireland
- River States Conference, an athletic conference affiliated with the National Association of Intercollegiate Athletics; formerly known as the Kentucky Intercollegiate Athletic Conference (KIAC)
- Roque Santa Cruz (born 1981), Paraguayan footballer

== Law ==
- Rules of the Supreme Court, rules which governed civil procedure in England and Wales between 1883 and 1999
- Revised Statutes of Canada, the published and updated laws and ordinances of Canada

== Other ==
- RSC Brands, automotive products company
- RailSimulator.com, a British video game developer and publisher, since renamed to Dovetail Games
- Reader service card, a reply card inserted in a magazine
- Recessed Single Contact bulb; see Lightbulb socket
- Regional Security Complex, a theory concerning international relations
- RuneScape Classic, a massively multiplayer online role-playing game developed and published by Jagex Games Studio
- Toyota RSC, a 2-door SUV concept car
