= Pamela Thomas =

British condensed matter physicist

- Education: University of Oxford
- Known for: Condensed matter physics
- Scientific career
- Workplaces: University of Warwick
- Doctoral advisor: Mike Glazer

Pamela Anne Thomas is a British condensed matter physicist, and former pro vice chancellor for research at the University of Warwick, where she leads the Ferroelectrics & Crystallography group. Her work focuses on the structure and related properties of ferroelectric, piezoelectric and nonlinear optical crystals, ceramics and thin-films. From September 2020 to April 2024, she served as the chief executive officer of the Faraday Institution, an organisation which advances energy storage science and technology.

== Education ==
Thomas studied at Physics at the University of Oxford. She completed her DPhil, 'Optical activity in crystals' at the University of Oxford in 1987 under Professor Mike Glazer.

== Career ==
In 1992, Thomas was awarded the Physical Crystallography Prize of the British Crystallographic Association.

From 2009–2012, Thomas was the director of the Science City Research Alliance (SCRA) for the Universities of Birmingham and Warwick. SCRA was a collaboration between the University of Birmingham and the University of Warwick, intended to provide world-leading research and knowledge support across three major platforms: advanced materials, energy futures and translational medicine. Set up in Warwick & Birmingham, with support from the European Regional Development Fund and by Advantage West Midlands, it provided a £58 M investment in state-of-the-art equipment, housed in purpose-designed buildings with dedicated technical support and HEFCE funded (£10 M) research fellows.

In 2011, Thomas was appointed the chair of the Faculty of Science at the University of Warwick. Thomas was the Pro Vice Chancellor for Research at the University of Warwick, and served as a Pro Vice Chancellor from 2014 to 2021. She served as a trustee of the Faraday Institution before being appointed its chief executive in September 2020, and was previously on the board of the Alan Turing Institute where she represented the University of Warwick. Thomas chaired the UK's Open Research Data Task Force, which was established by Jo Johnson in 2016.
