= Saiful Islam (chemist) =

British chemist and professor of materials modelling (born 1963)

Professor Saiful Islam FRSC FIMMM
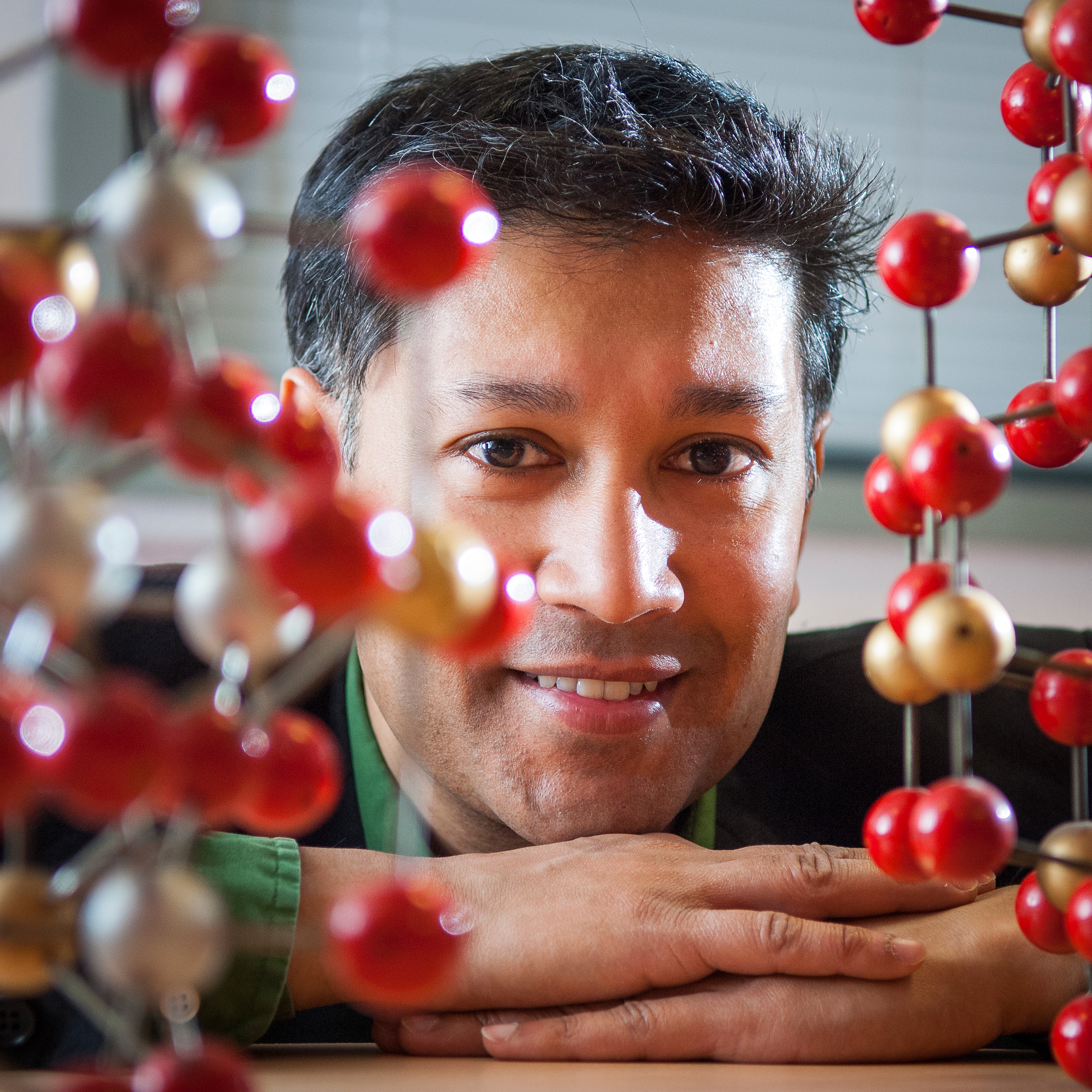
- Saiful Islam with crystal structures
- Born: 14 August 1963 (age 63); Karachi, Pakistan
- Education: University College London (BSc, PhD)
- Known for: Chemistry of Energy Materials; Royal Institution Christmas Lectures (2016 Lecturer)
- Awards: RSC Environment Prize (2025) Faraday Institution STEM Outreach Award (2024) IOM3 Robert Perrin Award (2023); Hughes Medal (2022); American Chemical Society Award for Energy Chemistry (2020); RSC Peter Day Award for Materials Chemistry (2017); Wolfson Research Merit Award (2013–2018); RSC Sustainable Energy Award (2013)
- Scientific career
- Fields: Materials chemistry Lithium-ion batteries Solid-state battery Perovskite solar cells
- Workplaces: University of Oxford; University of Bath; University of Surrey; The Eastman Kodak Company; University College London
- Doctoral advisor: Richard Catlow FRSC FRS FInstP
- Website: www.materials.ox.ac.uk/peoplepages/islam.html

Saiful Islam (born 14 August 1963) is a British chemist and professor of materials modelling at the Department of Materials, University of Oxford. Islam is a Fellow of the Royal Society of Chemistry (FRSC), and received the Royal Society's Wolfson Research Merit Award and Hughes Medal, and the American Chemical Society Award for Energy Chemistry for his major contributions to the fundamental atomistic understanding of new materials for lithium batteries and perovskite solar cells.

Islam is an atheist who refused the Order of the British Empire citing discomfort with the phrase "British Empire" and its link to colonialism.

== Biography ==
=== Early life and education ===
Islam was born in 1963 in Karachi, Pakistan to ethnically Bengali parents. The family moved to London in 1964 and he grew up in Crouch End, north London. There he went to Stationers' Company's School, a state comprehensive. He received both a BSc degree in chemistry and a PhD (1988) from University College London, where he studied under Professor Richard Catlow. Subsequently, he held a postdoctoral fellowship at the Eastman Kodak laboratories in Rochester, New York, working on oxide superconductors.

=== Career and research ===
Islam returned to the UK in 1990 to become a lecturer, then reader, at the University of Surrey. In January 2006 he was appointed professor of Materials Chemistry at the University of Bath. His group applies computational methods combined with structural techniques to study fundamental atomistic properties such as ion conduction, defect chemistry and surface structures. In January 2022, he joined the Department of Materials, University of Oxford as a professor of materials modelling.

Islam has been a member of the editorial board of the Journal of Materials Chemistry, and sits on the advisory board of the RSC journal Energy and Environmental Science. He was Principal Investigator of the Faraday Institution's 'CATMAT' project on Next-generation Lithium-Ion Cathode Materials.

=== Outreach and public engagement ===
Islam presented the 2016 Royal Institution Christmas Lectures, entitled "Supercharged: Fueling the Future" on the theme of energy, a commemorative lecture series for the BBC which celebrated 80 years since the Christmas Lectures were first broadcast on television in 1936. The lectures were broadcast on BBC Four, and achieved over 3.5 million interactions through the BBC broadcasts and social media. Islam was interviewed before these lectures for articles in The Guardian. A demonstration in these lectures led to a Guinness World Record for the highest voltage (1,275 Volts) produced by a fruit battery using more than 1,000 lemons. Islam later broke that record in 2021 after using 2,923 lemons to produce 2,307.8 Volts.

Islam has served on the Diversity Committee of the Royal Society, and was selected for the Royal Society's 'Inspiring Scientists' project that recorded the life stories of British scientists with minority ethnic heritage in partnership with National Life Stories at the British Library. His outreach activities include talks on energy materials to student audiences using 3D glasses organised by the TTP Education in Action at the UCL Institute of Education, London. He was interviewed for The Life Scientific programme on BBC Radio 4 in October 2019.

On 23 November 2022, Islam was an invited speaker at the Brian Cox & Robin Ince's Compendium of Reason charity event, which was at the Royal Albert Hall.

=== Personal life ===
As of 2021, Islam lives in Bath with his wife, Gita Sunthankar (a local GP), and their two children, Yasmin and Zak.

Islam is an atheist and Patron of Humanists UK.

== Awards and honours ==
Islam is a Fellow of the Royal Society of Chemistry (FRSC) since 2008 and the Institute of Materials, Minerals and Mining (FIMMM), as well as Honorary Fellow of the British Science Association.

Islam has received several research awards including 2008 Francis Bacon Medal for Fuel Cell Science, 2011 Materials Chemistry Division Lecturer Award, 2013 Sustainable Energy Award, 2013 Wolfson Research Merit Award from the Royal Society, 2017 Peter Day Award for Materials Chemistry, 2020 Storch Award in Energy Chemistry from the American Chemical Society, 2022 Hughes Medal from the Royal Society, and the Robert Perrin Award from Institute of Materials, Minerals and Mining. In 2025, he was awarded Royal Society of Chemistry's Environment, Sustainability and Energy Prize.

Islam received the Faraday Society's STEM Outreach and Public Engagement award in 2024.

In 2019, he declined a New Year Honours Award of an Order of the British Empire, because he has "never been comfortable with the words ‘British Empire’ in this award and the links to empire, colonialism, and slavery".

Media offices
Preceded by Kevin Fong	Royal Institution Christmas Lecturer; 2016	Succeeded by Sophie Scott
