= Vega Science Trust =

Not-for-profit organisation

- Founded: 1995–2012
- Founder: Sir Harold Kroto
- Purpose: Promotion of Science
- Location: Falmer, Sussex, United Kingdom
- Region served: United Kingdom and overseas
- Key people: Sir Harold Kroto, Chairman of the Board of Trustees; Prof. Edmund Copeland, Trustee; Dr. Chris Ewels, Trustee; Dr. Nicole Grobert, Trustee; Murray Weston, Trustee; Gill Watson, CEO
- Website: www.vega.org.uk

The Vega Science Trust was a not-for-profit organisation which provided a platform from which scientists can communicate directly with the public on science by using moving image, sound and other related means. The Trust closed in 2012 but the website and streaming video remains active (based at Sheffield University).

== History ==
Founded in 1995 by Nobel Laureate Sir Harry Kroto and BBC Education Producer Patrick Reams the Vega Science Trust was awarded a COPUS start-up grant from the Royal Society in 1995 and then went on in 1999 to be allocated core funding from the Office of Science and Technology (OST). Starting with recording science programmes for terrestrial television the Vega Science Trust produced a number of programmes such as recordings of Royal Institution Discources which were broadcast on BBC 2 and a set of Masterclasses. In 2001 Harry Kroto was awarded the Royal Society Michael Faraday Prize - the UK's premier award for science communication 'for his dedication to the notion of working scientists being communicators of their work and in particular for his establishment of the Vega Science Trust whose films and related activities reflect the excitement of scientific discovery to the public'. The Trust went on to co-produce with the BBC Open University a set of science discussion programmes covering hot topics such as Stem Cells, Energy, Mobile Phones, GM Food, Disease, Nanotechnology and Ageing. With the BBC/Open University the Trust also produced with sponsorship from HEFCE Widening Participation Team a set of award-winning career programmes featuring young scientists. Both series were broadcast on BBC2.

Very early audio-visual recordings of individual scientists are relatively rare but in the recent past some recordings were carried out by such organisations as the BBC. In 1997 the Vega Science Trust embarked on a plan to record in-depth interviews with scientists such as Rotblat, Sanger, Perutz, Cornforth, Walter Kohn and Richard Ernst which could be both viewed and preserved as an historical record for the future. More recently the British Library embarked on a similar project of recording audio-visual interviews under the National Life Stories project although at present their archive consists of oral recordings of scientists. The Vega Science Trust's in-depth interviews with scientists led onto a project recording interviews with Nobel Laureates attending the annual Nobel Laureate Meetings at Lindau in 2004/5/6. In 2006 the Vega Science Trust's website received a special mention at The International Association for Media Science Awards.

In 2007 the Vega Science Trust started on-going work with Jonathan Hare BBC Rough Science on a series of short instructional films intended to show how things work. For instance a number of the films show how we can generate electricity, another shows how we can generate wind power, others the molecular structure of C60, carbon nanotubes and graphene.

From 2007–2010 the Trust concentrated on bringing to the public's attention the process of science research. The Nano2Hybrids EU STReP project for instance was an innovative project where research scientists recorded their own progress on a research project to invent a gas sensor made using carbon nanotubes. In addition recording science in society projects such as Women in Nanotechnology and Diversity illuminate work towards promoting women scientists into decision making positions in science research environments.

The Vega Science Trust closed in March 2012 after 17 years of operation. However, the website will continue to host the existing film archive.

== Governance ==
The Vega Science Trust was governed by a board of five Trustees who are active research scientists, media, copyright, and educational specialists. Trustees step down and/or are re-elected each year.

The Vega Science Trust employed one member of staff (and for a period, a second technical member) and operated in a mixed economy of core grant-in-aid support from Florida State University, and from research grants and sponsorship. It was an independent body with its own self-contained offices, initially in the University of Sussex chemistry department, and later at the Innovation Centre, University of Sussex, Brighton.

== Vision ==
The Vega Science Trust aimed to see science more fully integrated into our everyday culture. Vega's vision has been to do so by providing a platform from which scientists can broadcast science programmes directly to the public.

Activities

- Recording scientists.

Covering a wide array of research.

- Making available to the public by streaming from the Vega Science Trust's website.

Videos stream in different formats.

- Creating an historical archive of some of the world's most eminent scientists.

Interviewing Nobel Laureates and other eminent scientists.

- Experimenting with new ways of outreaching/engaging with the public via audio-visual means.

Creating different programme formats.

- Provide on-line science resources for school, university and the public via informal learning.

Creating informative videos for imparting scientific concepts.

Vega Science Trust Collection

The collection of recordings also acts as an historical record and archive of world scientists and their research discoveries. Recorded to broadcast quality they provide a valuable collection, much of which is open to the public via the Vega Science Trust's website.

=== Video clips ===
- Vega Science Trust YouTube channel
