= James Marrow =

British materials scientist (born 1966)

Professor James Marrow
- Born: Thomas James Marrow; 23 November 1966 (age 58); Bromborough, England
- Education: University of Cambridge (MA, Ph.D)
- Scientific career
- Fields: Materials science specialised in Ceramic matrix composite Nuclear graphite Micromechanics; Physical metallurgy Fatigue and Fracture mechanics X-ray crystallography including XCT and Synchrotron radiation
- Institutions: University of Oxford
- Thesis: Fatigue mechanisms in an embrittled duplex stainless steel (1991)
- Doctoral advisor: Julia E. King
- Website: Materials Department

Thomas James Marrow (born 23 November 1966) is a British scientist who is a professor of nuclear materials at the University of Oxford and holds the James Martin Chair in Energy Materials. He specialises in physical metallurgy, micromechanics, and X-ray crystallography of engineering materials, mainly ceramic matrix composite and nuclear graphite.

== Biography ==
=== Early life and education ===
James Marrow was born on 23 November 1966 in Bromborough, Wirral to John Williams Marrow and Mary Elizabeth Marrow. He attended Wirral Grammar School for Boys, then graduated with a 1st Class Honours Master of Arts (M.A) in Natural Sciences (Materials Science) from the University of Cambridge in 1988, where he was a student at Clare College, Cambridge before pursuing and completing a Doctor of Philosophy degree in 1991. During his PhD, he studied the Fatigue mechanisms in embrittled duplex stainless steel and was supervised by Julia King.

=== Career ===
From 1992 to 1993, Marrow was appointed as postdoctoral research associate in the Department of Materials, University of Oxford, and a junior research fellow at Linacre College, Oxford, but moved with an Engineering and Physical Sciences Research Council (EPSRC) postdoctoral research fellowship to the School of Metallurgy and Materials, University of Birmingham. In 2001, he joined the Manchester Materials Science Centre, University of Manchester, as senior lecturer in physical metallurgy, where he became assistant director of Materials Performance Centre in 2002 and the director in 2009.

Marrow moved to the University of Oxford to become Oxford Martin School co-director of the school programme in Nuclear and Energy Materials from 2010 to 2015, Professor in Energy Materials, Department of Materials, Oxford University, and Fellow of Mansfield College, Oxford. As of August 2023, Marrow is the Associate Head of Department of Materials (Teaching).

Marrow is a council member of the UK Forum for Engineering Structural Integrity (FESI), UK representative for the European Energy Research Alliance Joint Programme on Nuclear Materials, member (ex-chair) of the OECD-NEA Expert Group on Innovative Structural Materials, independent advisor to the UK Office of Nuclear Regulation on materials/structural integrity, and UK representative on Graphite for BEIS to the Generation IV International Forum. Marrow is the co-director of the Nuclear Research Centre (NRC), which is a joint venture between the University of Bristol and the University of Oxford to train new nuclear scientists and engineers.

=== Personal life ===
Marrow married Daiva Kojelyte in 1998 and he is a father of a son and a daughter.

== Research ==
Marrow's research focuses on the degradation of structural materials, the role of microstructure, and the mechanisms of materials ageing. A key aspect is the investigation of fundamental mechanisms of damage accumulation - including irradiation - using novel materials characterisation techniques. This has concentrated recently on computed X-ray tomography and strain mapping by digital image correlation and digital volume correlation, together with X-ray and neutron diffraction. He applies these techniques to study the degradation of Generation IV nuclear materials such as graphite and silicon carbide composites, as well as new materials for electrical energy storage.

== Public engagement ==
Marrow is part of I'm a Scientist, Get me out of here! energy generation zone. He has also been a key developer and academic consultant for the Dissemination of IT for the Promotion of Materials Science (DoITPoMS). Global Cycle Network Technology (GCN Tech) interviewed James about carbon fibre fatigue and strain in 2022.

== See also ==
- Philip J. Withers – British materials scientist (born 1963)
- David Knowles (engineer) – Researcher
- Roger Reed – Researcher and university teacher
- Who's Who (UK) – British biographical dictionary
