= Monochromatic wavelength dispersive x-ray fluorescence =

Spectroscopy analysis technique

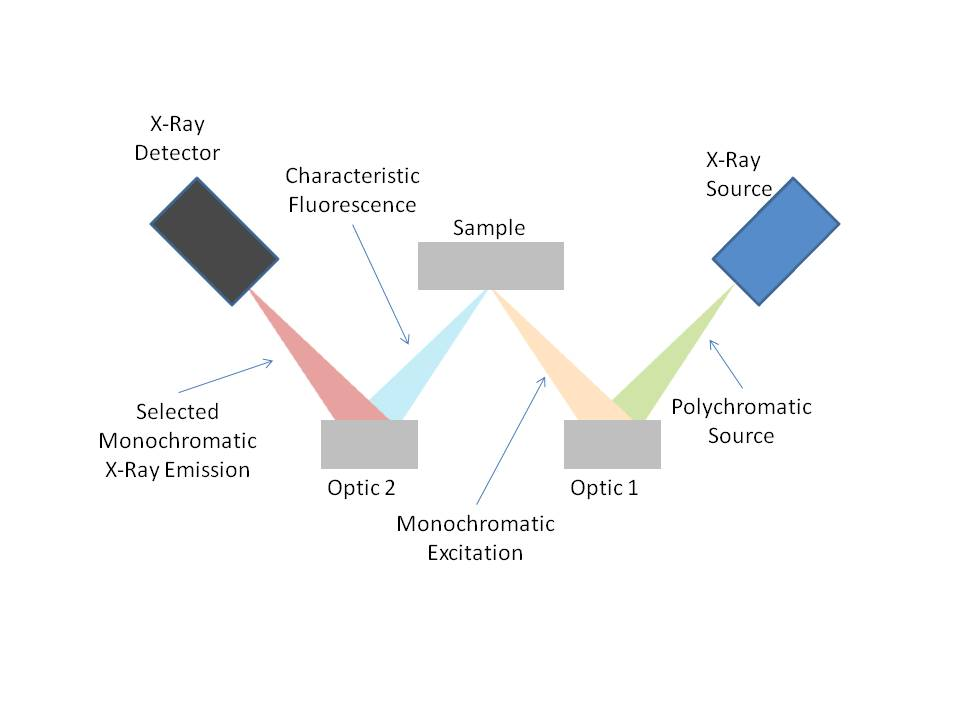
Schematic of MWD XRF

Monochromatic wavelength dispersive x-ray fluorescence (MWD XRF) is an enhanced version of conventional wavelength-dispersive X-ray spectroscopy (WDXRF) elemental analysis. The key difference is that MWD XRF uses a doubly curved crystal X-ray optic between the X-ray source and the sample resulting in monochromatic excitation. This additional optic creates a high-intensity X-ray beam on a small spot size without increasing the power of the X-ray source. An MWD XRF instrument is constructed from a low-power X-ray tube, a point-to-point focusing optic for excitation, a sample cell, a focusing optic that collects the fluorescence from the sample, and an X-ray detector. By using an optic between the X-ray source and the sample, a monochromatic beam free of bremsstrahlung, excites the sample, eliciting the secondary fluorescence X-rays needed for elemental analysis. By restricting the band of wavelengths used for excitation, a much higher signal to background ratio is achieved. This type of excitation allows much lower limits of detection and faster reading times.
