= Emma Kendrick (academic) =

Professor of Energy Materials

- Education: University of Manchester; University of Aberdeen; Keele University
- Known for: Energy materials
- Scientific career
- Workplaces: University of Birmingham; Warwick Manufacturing Group; Loughborough University

Emma Kendrick is Professor of Energy Materials at the University of Birmingham where her work is focused on new materials for batteries and fuel cells. She is a Fellow of the Royal Society of Chemistry and Institute of Materials, Minerals and Mining.

== Early life and education ==
Kendrick studied chemistry at the University of Manchester, later moving to University of Aberdeen in Scotland where she earned a master's degree in solid state chemistry. For her doctoral thesis, Kendrick went to Keele University to study low temperature synthetic routes to inorganic pigments. She later did postdoctoral research with Sandra Dann at the Loughborough University, as well as Peter Slater and Saiful Islam at the University of Surrey.

== Research and career ==
Kendrick spent several years in industry, during which she worked at both Fife Batteries and Surion Energy Limited. She joined Sharp Corporation in 2010 where she established a research and development program in sodium-ion batteries, a low cost alternative to lithium-ion batteries. Her focus at Sharp was on the development of high energy density devices using cathodes optimized for stable voltage and capacity.

She notably demonstrated a sodium-ion battery pouch cell with high volumetric energy density that has applications in the automotive and portable electronics industries, resulting in a promotion to Chief Technologist of Energy Storage.

In 2016, Kendrick was appointed to Reader in Electrochemical Energy Materials at the Warwick Manufacturing Group.

In 2018, Kendrick joined the University of Birmingham as a member of the Materials Chemistry Division of the Royal Society of Chemistry as well as serving on the materials science self-assessment team at the Engineering and Physical Sciences Research Council. She has several patents in chemical synthesis of materials for batteries. She holds an honorary position at University College London. She is a member of the Energy Research Accelerator Research Council.

In addition to her sodium-ion battery materials development work, Kendrick has also established herself in the area of lithium-ion battery manufacturing and lithium-ion battery materials recycling, a new research program designed to reclaim and reuse material from end of life electric vehicle batteries.

Kendrick is particularly concerned about the implications of supply chain issues associated the loss (or export) of rare and mined materials that are used in modern battery chemistries. She has pioneered efforts to increase the safety of the recovery processes used to reclaim battery materials, through the use of a brine discharge method using neutral salts that minimizes the rate of corrosion making it possible to recover the separated cathode and anode materials. In support of her recycling efforts, Kendrick has called on battery manufacturers to make batteries that are easier to dismantle. Her research is supported by the Faraday Battery Challenge, a four-year investment by the Government of the United Kingdom that looks to develop new lower cost materials, advance recycling processes, and identify battery degradation pathways.
