= Hazel Assender =

Materials scientist

Hazel Assender CPhys
- Born: Hazel Elaine Assender
- Education: University of Cambridge (MA, PhD)
- Scientific career
- Fields: Polymers; Thin film electronics Microstructural Characterisation; Materials science
- Workplaces: University of Oxford
- Thesis: Magnetically induced microstructures in liquid crystalline polymers (1994)
- Website: www.materials.ox.ac.uk/peoplepages/assender.html

Hazel Elaine Assender CPhys, is a professor of materials at the Department of Materials, University of Oxford. She is an expert in polymer chemistry, thin film electronics and nanomaterials. Assender is a fellow of Linacre College, Oxford.

== Education ==
Assender studied the Natural Sciences Tripos at the University of Cambridge, graduating in 1990. In 1990, Assender started her PhD in the Department of Materials Science and Metallurgy and completed her thesis on "Magnetically induced microstructures in liquid crystalline polymers" in 1994.

== Research and career ==
After two years as a post doctoral researcher, in 1996 Assender moved to a lectureship in the Department of Materials at the University of Oxford where she focuses on thin films and coatings of polymer materials and onto polymer substrates. During her time in Oxford, she has developed expertise in roll-to-roll deposition, gas barriers, photovoltaics, and polymer electronics (including transistors and circuits). Assender has worked 80% full-time since her second child was born.

In 2001 Assender co-edited the book "Aerospace Materials" with Brian Cantor and Patrick Grant. She spoke at the 2015 University of Cambridge "Worshipful Company of Armourers and Brasiers Company forum", a highlight of the academic UK materials science calendar, to highlight roll-to-roll vacuum processing to create multi-layer polymer electronic thin films.

Assender continues to collaborate across the UK and is currently a member of the Centre for Plastic Electronics Centre for Doctoral Training (with colleagues from Oxford, Imperial, and Queen Mary University London). Assender's research is inspired by her desire to solve industrial challenges. Her recent work has considered wearable electronics as part of the Wearable and Flexible Technologies (WAFT) consortium with colleagues at Oxford, Southampton and Exeter Universities.
