= Richmondshire Concerts =

The Richmondshire Concerts take place in Richmond, North Yorkshire. The society (officially Richmondshire Subscription Concerts) was founded in 1947 by Tom Carr, and is a registered charity. The society attracts concert-goers from across a very wide area, including North Yorkshire, Teesside and County Durham.

The society puts on six classical chamber-music concerts a year at Richmond School on Saturday evenings from September to April. The Society usually has more than 200 subscribers (peaking at 276 in the 2018-19 season) who pay £60 a head (2023-24 season) for a season ticket. Tickets for individual events are available online or at the door.

Performers in the last 20 years have included Northern Sinfonia and the Sorrel Quartet, Belcea Quartet, Allegri Quartet, Maggini Quartet, Carducci Quartet, Benyounes Quartet, Doric Quartet, Escher Quartet, Brodsky Quartet, Barbirolli Quartet and Prazak Quartet.
