= Department of Materials, University of Oxford =

UK academic department

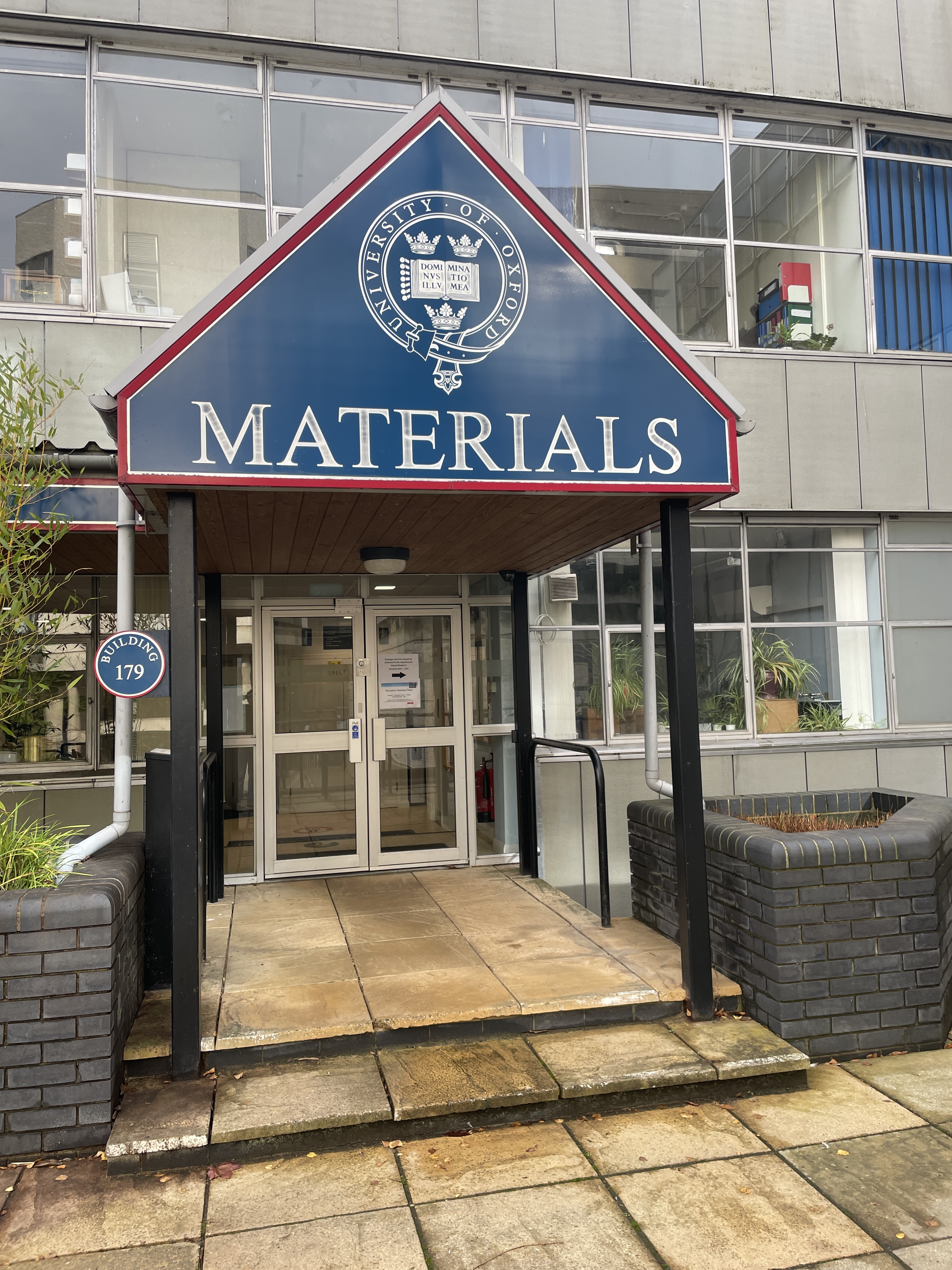
- Hume-Rothery building
- Former name: Department of Metallurgy
- Established: 1950s
- Head of Department: Sir Professor Peter Bruce
- Faculty: Mathematical, Physical and Life Sciences Division, University of Oxford
- Staff: +30
- Students: +400
- Location: Oxford, United Kingdom; 51.7603685°N 1.2592798°W
- Website: www.materials.ox.ac.uk

The Department of Materials is an academic department at the Mathematical, Physical and Life Sciences Division at the University of Oxford in Oxford, England, United Kingdom.

It was founded in the 1950s as the Department of Metallurgy, by William Hume-Rothery, who was a reader in Oxford's Department of Inorganic Chemistry.

Around 190 staff work in the Department of Materials full-time, including professors, lecturers, independent fellows, researchers and support staff. There are around 30 academic staff positions of which four are Chairs. The Isaac Wolfson Chair in Metallurgy was set up in the late 1950s. Sir Peter Hirsch formerly held the chair. The current holder of the chair is Peter Bruce FRS. Other Chairs in the department include the Vesuvius Chair of Materials held by Patrick Grant FREng, Professor in the Physical Examination of Materials formerly held by David Cockayne FRS and the James Martin Chair in Energy Materials held by James Marrow.

Research is done in the broad fields of structural and nuclear materials, device materials, polymers and biomaterials, nanomaterials, processing and manufacturing, characterization, and computational materials modelling.

The department offers undergraduate degrees in Materials Science and Materials, Economics and Management, having around 160 undergraduates, and around 240 postgraduate students, particularly DPhil students pursuing advanced research.

In addition to its own buildings, the department shares seven buildings with the Department of Engineering Science on a triangular plot with Banbury Road to the west and Parks Road to the east. In addition, the department has extensive facilities at Begbroke Science Park, north of the city, which was purchased and founded on behalf of the university by Professor Brian Cantor when he was head of the department in the 1990s.

== Facilities ==
The department host different types of mechanical testing labs, e.g., nano-indentation lab, Digital image correlation lab, fatigue testing lab, computed tomography machines, the David Cockayne Centre for Electron Microscopy, Oxford Materials Characterisation, Atom probe tomography, etc.

The Department of Materials has instruments for high-resolution electron microscopy and microanalysis. The equipment within The David Cockayne Centre for Electron Microscopy (DCCEM) can be broadly categorised as transmission electron microscopes (TEM), scanning electron microscopes (SEM), focused ion beam (FIB) and specimen preparation systems.

- Oxford Materials Characterisation Service (OMCS) offers a service for the investigation of materials and materials-related problems to research groups and the industry.
  - Optical microscope: optical and electron microscopes to image and analyse samples providing morphology, micro-analysis and phase determination.
  - Surface analysis: surface analysis techniques to investigate the properties of surfaces including elemental composition and chemistry together with depth profiling and imaging capabilities.
  - X-RAY techniques: X-ray techniques to non-destructively investigate the properties of materials, including composition, crystal structure, and physical form.
  - Spectroscopy Molecules: The use of the absorption, emission, or scattering of electromagnetic radiation by atoms or molecules to obtain compositional information about the material of interest and to study physical processes.
  - Thermal analysis: Instruments available to determine the thermal properties of materials including thermogravimetric, differential scanning calorimetry, and microcalorimetry.
  - Particle size analysis: A variety of equipment depending on particle size and required analysis.
- The electron Physical Science Imaging Centre (ePSIC) is a national facility for aberration-corrected electron microscopy. ePSIC was established as a collaboration between the University of Oxford, Diamond Light Source and Johnson Matthey. Access to ePSIC is through a peer-reviewed application process which is open to UK, EU and international scientists. There are two main calls for proposals each year. The deadline for these calls is 1700hrs on the first Wednesday in April and October. ePSIC also accepts Rapid Access application proposals which can be submitted at any time. University of Oxford academics who have grant funding for microscope access can bypass the peer review process and guarantee microscope time.
- Oxford Royce (part of Henry Royce Institute) focuses on Energy Storage materials such as batteries, supercapacitors and thermoelectrics to solve the material challenges involved in the all-solid-state battery.

== Head department and chairs ==
=== Head of department ===
- 1956–1966 William Hume-Rothery
- 1966–1992 Sir Peter Hirsch
- 1992–1994 Sir Richard Brook
- 1994–1995 David Pettifor
- 1995–2000 Brian Cantor
- 2000–2005 George D. W. Smith
- 2005–2015 Chris Grovenor
- 2015–2018 Patrick Grant
- 2018–2019 Angus Wilkinson (deputy)
- 2019–2021 Angus Wilkinson and Peter Nellist
- 2021–2022 Angus Wilkinson and Hazel E. Assender
- 2022–2024 Hazel E. Assender
- 2024–2025 James Marrow (acting)
- 2025–2026 Peter Nellist
- 2026–present Sir Peter Bruce

=== Isaac Wolfson Professors ===
The Isaac Wolfson chair is associated with a fellowship at St Edmund Hall

Isaac Wolfson Professors of Metallurgy

- 1950s–1966 William Hume-Rothery
- 1966–1992 Peter Hirsch
- 1992–2011 David Pettifor

Isaac Wolfson Professors of Materials

- 2014–date Peter Bruce

== Current academic staff ==
As of June 2023 there are 30 academics, including the notable following people:

- Peter Bruce, Wolfson Professor of Materials.
- G. Andrew D. Briggs, Emeritus Professor of Nanomaterials.
- Harish Bhaskaran, Professor of Applied Nanomaterials. Associate Head of MPLS (SP)
- Nicole Grobert, Professor of Nanomaterials.
- Roger C. Reed, Professor of Materials and Solid Mechanics.
- Patrick Grant, Vesuvius Chair Professor of Materials and the current Pro-Vice Chancellor (Research) of the University of Oxford.
- James Marrow, James Martin Professor of Energy Materials.
- Peter Nellist, Professor of Materials and the current Head of the Department of Materials
- Angus Wilkinson, Professor of Materials.
- Angus Kirkland, JEOL Professor of Electron Microscopy.
- Saiful Islam, Statutory Chair in Materials Modelling.

== Research Areas and Groups ==
Research within the Department of Materials is broadly categorized into the following areas:

- Structural and Nuclear Materials
- Energy Storage Materials.
- Device Materials.
- Polymers and Biomaterials.
- Nanomaterials.
- Processing and Manufacturing.
- Characterisation.
- Computational Materials Modelling.

A number of research groups are hosted within the department including Other groups like the Advanced Nanoscale Engineering Group, Polymers Group, Biomaterials Group, Solar Energy Materials Group, Materials for Fusion and Fission Power (MFFP) group, and also:

- Atom probe tomography Group using APT, a microscopy technique that provides 3D atom-by-atom imaging of materials with a uniquely powerful combination of spatial and chemical resolution. For more than 40 years, the Atom Probe Research Group in the Department of Materials at the University of Oxford has maintained a tradition of pioneering field ion microscopy research and in particular the development and application of the atom probe technique. The group is currently active in all aspects of atom probe research, including establishing new materials applications, instrumentation and the development of 3D reconstruction and data analysis techniques.
- Peter Bruce Research Group is interested in the fundamental science of ionically conducting solids (which includes intercalation compounds and polymer electrolytes), in the synthesis of new materials with new properties or combinations of properties, in understanding these properties and in exploring their applications in new devices, especially energy storage devices such as rechargeable lithium batteries.
- The Oxford Micromechanics Group (OMG!) is interested in how materials (engineered and naturally occurring) respond, at the microstructural level, to externally applied loading - mechanical, thermal, and/or environmental (chemical, irradiation). The complex patterning of local stress and strain distributions and how they evolve and are linked to particular aspects of the microstructure provides many fascinating intellectual challenges. Technical impact comes from building sound understanding and models of how materials fail. This is central to setting safe performance windows and developing new alloys and microstructures with greater capability. Working on a range of materials systems including those for nuclear, aerospace, and automotive sectors, as well minerals and have made significant contributions to the development of new testing and characterisation methods allowing us to gain new insights.
- Nanostructured Materials Groups studies the next generation of nanostructured materials with unique properties that will impact electronic, optoelectronic, and energy applications. Particular focus is made to the atomic-level structure and dynamics of nanomaterials probed by aberration-corrected transmission electron microscopy and spectroscopy. A wide range of nanoscale characterization tools (TEM, SEM, AFM, FIB) are used to probe materials across all dimension scales. New types of nanoscale devices are produced in clean-room nanofabrication facilities, utilizing materials ranging from 2D Crystals (graphene, BN, MoS2, WS2 etc.), 1D wires and nanotubes, to 0D quantum dots. The group is multi-disciplinary and collaborates extensively with a wide range of scientists within USA, and internationally.
- The Fab at Oxford is run by the Department of Materials for the University and comprises full nanoscale and microscope fabrication facilities for device fabrication. Modernised and centralised under the leadership of Harish Bhaskaran and with support of the Henry Royce Institute, the fab offers open access to several research groups across the University.

== See also ==
- Department of Materials, Imperial College London
- Department of Materials Science and Metallurgy, University of Cambridge
