= Peter Bruce =

British chemist

Sir Peter Bruce FRS FRSE FRSC
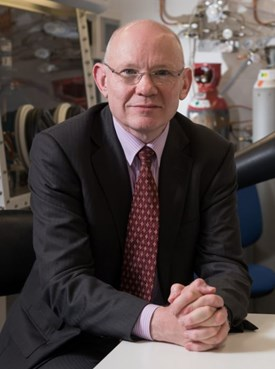
- Born: Peter George Bruce; 2 October 1956 (age 70); Aberdeen, Scotland
- Education: University of Aberdeen (BSc, PhD)
- Known for: Lithium–air battery
- Awards: Arfvedson Schlenk Award; Highly Cited Researcher; RSC Liversidge Award
- Scientific career
- Workplaces: University of Oxford; University of St Andrews; Heriot-Watt University
- Thesis: Lithium ion conducting solid electrolytes (1981)
- Website: www.materials.ox.ac.uk/peoplepages/bruce.html

Sir Peter George Bruce, FRS, FRSE, FRSC is a British chemist, and Wolfson Professor of Materials in the Department of Materials at the University of Oxford. Between 2018 and 2023, he served as Physical Secretary and Vice President of the Royal Society. Bruce is a founder and Chief Scientist of the Faraday Institution.

== Education ==
Bruce was educated at Aberdeen Grammar School and the University of Aberdeen where he was awarded a Bachelor of Science degree in 1978 and a PhD in 1982. He completed his PhD research on lithium ion conducting solid electrolytes under the supervision of Prof. A.R. West.

== Research ==
Bruce's primary research interests are in the fields of materials chemistry and electrochemistry; with a particular emphasis on energy storage materials for lithium and sodium batteries. He is interested in the fundamental science of ionically conducting solids and intercalation compounds, the synthesis of new materials with new properties or combinations of properties, understanding these properties and exploring their applications in energy storage. Although ionically conducting solids represent the starting point for much of his research, he has extended his interests beyond the confines of this subject alone. His current research interests include cathode materials, solid state batteries and the Li-air battery.

Bruce has published over 390 papers in this area and has been recognized as a Highly Cited Researcher by the Web of Science Group each year since 2015.

=== Solid state batteries ===
All solid state batteries have the potential to revolutionize the electric vehicles of the future. Replacing the flammable organic liquid electrolyte currently used in Li ion cells with a solid will enable the use of an alkali metal anode which will increase energy density and improve safety. Bruce's interests are in understanding the fundamental processes that are taking place and those, such as void and dendrite formation, which ultimately lead to failure of the cell. Until 2023 Bruce led the Faraday Institution's SOLBAT project which aims to "break down the barriers which are preventing the progression to market of solid-state batteries." He now leads the project's workpackage on the anode.

=== Intercalation Compounds ===
Lithium intercalation into solid hosts is the fundamental mechanism underpinning the operation of electrodes in rechargeable lithium batteries. He seeks to synthesise new lithium intercalation compounds with unusual properties or combinations of properties. He is especially interested in cathode materials for Li and Na ion batteries. Recently his work in this area has been concerned with compounds which can store additional charge, beyond the transition metal redox capacity, by participation of oxygen in reversible anionic redox processes, including the formation of molecular oxygen in the solid. Bruce leads WP1 of the Faraday Institution's CATMAT project.

=== Lithium-air battery ===
Peter G. Bruce is one of the initiators of the Lithium-air battery. The rechargeable lithium-ion battery has revolutionised portable electronics, it will be key to electrifying transport and to delivering secure and stable renewable electricity. However the highest energy density possible for Li-ion batteries is insufficient to meet future demands. The Li-air battery has the potential to transform energy storage and has the highest theoretical energy density of any known battery technology. His research focuses on understanding the fundamental processes underpinning its operation. Recent work has included investigating the kinetics of redox mediators and their use in Li-air cells.

== Awards and honours ==
Bruce has received a number of awards and honours in the UK and overseas. Bruce is an elected Fellow of the Royal Society of Chemistry, Fellow of the Royal Society, a Fellow of the Royal Society of Edinburgh and a member of the Leopoldina (German National Academy of Sciences). He was knighted in the 2022 Birthday Honours for services to science and innovation.

His awards and honours:

- 1999 Royal Society of Chemistry Award in Materials
- 2001 Royal Society Wolfson Merit Award
- 2003 Royal Society of Chemistry Beilby Medal and Prize
- 2003 Royal Society of Chemistry Interdisciplinary Award
- 2004 Royal Society of Chemistry John Jeyes Lectureship and Medal
- 2004 Royal Society of Edinburgh Gunning Victoria Jubilee Prize Lectureship (awarded every 4 years and only every 12 to chemists)
- 2005 Royal Society of Chemistry Solid State Chemistry Award
- 2008 Electrochemical Society (USA) Battery Division Award
- 2009 Royal Society of Chemistry Tilden Lectureship
- 2011 Arfvedson Schlenk Award of the German Chemical Society
- 2011 Carl Wagner Memorial Award of the Electrochemical Society (USA)
- 2012 Akzo Nobel UK Science Award (1st recipient)
- 2012 Galileo Galilei Award
- 2014 Royal Society of Chemistry Barker Medal
- 2015 International Medal for Materials Science and Technology, MRSI
- Honorary member of Materials Research Society of India
- 2015–23 Highly Cited Researcher
- 2016 Liversidge Award
- 2017 Royal Society Hughes Medal
- 2022 Knighthood for services to science and innovation
- 2022 Royal Society of Chemistry Longstaff Prize
- 2024 Foreign Member of the Chinese Academy of Sciences
- 2024 Elected Member of The Leopoldina, the German National Academy of Sciences
