= Geometrically necessary dislocations =

Geometrically necessary dislocations are like-signed dislocations needed to accommodate for plastic bending in a crystalline material. They are present when a material's plastic deformation is accompanied by internal plastic strain gradients. They are in contrast to statistically stored dislocations, with statistics of equal positive and negative signs, which arise during plastic flow from multiplication processes like the Frank-Read source.

== Dislocations in crystalline materials ==
=== Statistically stored dislocations ===
As straining progresses, the dislocation density increases and the dislocation mobility decreases during plastic flow. There are different ways through which dislocations can accumulate. Many of the dislocations are accumulated by multiplication, where dislocations encounters each other by chance. Dislocations stored in such progresses are called statistically stored dislocations, with corresponding density $\rho_{s}$. In other words, they are dislocations evolved from random trapping processes during plastic deformation.

=== Geometrically necessary dislocations ===
In addition to statistically stored dislocation, geometrically necessary dislocations are accumulated in strain gradient fields caused by geometrical constraints of the crystal lattice. In this case, the plastic deformation is accompanied by internal plastic strain gradients. The theory of geometrically necessary dislocations was first introduced by Nye in 1953. Since geometrically necessary dislocations are present in addition to statistically stored dislocations, the total density is the accumulation of two densities, e.g. $\rho_{s}+\rho_{g}$, where $\rho_{g}$ is the density of geometrically necessary dislocations.

== Concept ==
=== Single crystal ===
The plastic bending of a single crystal can be used to illustrate the concept of geometrically necessary dislocation, where the slip planes and crystal orientations are parallel to the direction of bending. The perfect (non-deformed) crystal has a length $l$ and thickness $t$. When the crystal bar is bent to a radius of curvature $r$, a strain gradient forms where a tensile strain occurs in the upper portion of the crystal bar, increasing the length of upper surface from $l$ to $l+dl$. Here $dl$ is positive and its magnitude is assumed to be $t\theta/2$. Similarly, the length of the opposite inner surface is decreased from $l$ to $l-dl$ due to the compression strain caused by bending. Thus, the strain gradient is the strain difference between the outer and inner crystal surfaces divided by the distance over which the gradient exists

$strain\ gradient= 2\frac{dl/l}{t}=2\frac{t\theta/2l}{t}=\frac{\theta}{l}$. Since $l=r\theta$, $strain\ gradient=\frac{1}{r}$.

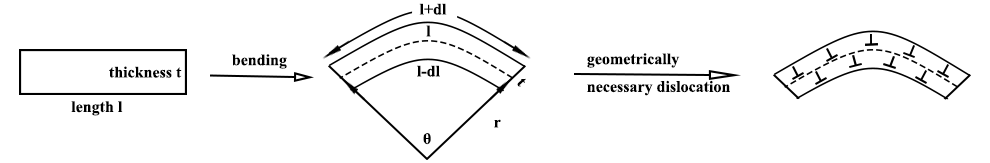
Figure to explain the formation of geometrically necessary dislocations in a single crystal

The surface length divided by the interatomic spacing is the number of crystal planes on this surface. The interatomic spacing $b$ is equal to the magnitude of Burgers vector $b$. Thus the numbers of crystal planes on the outer (tension) surface and inner (compression) surface are $(l+dl)/b$ and $(l-dl)/b$, respectively. Therefore, the concept of geometrically necessary dislocations is introduced that the same sign edge dislocations compensate the difference in the number of atomic planes between surfaces. The density of geometrically necessary dislocations $\rho_{g}$ is this difference divided by the crystal surface area

$\rho_{g}=\frac{(l+dl)/b-(l-dl)/b}{lt}=2\frac{dl}{ltb}=\frac{1}{rb}=\frac{strain\ gradient}{b}$.

More precisely, the orientation of the slip plane and direction with respect to the bending should be considered when calculating the density of geometrically necessary dislocations. In a special case when the slip plane normals are parallel to the bending axis and the slip directions are perpendicular to this axis, ordinary dislocation glide instead of geometrically necessary dislocation occurs during bending process. Thus, a constant of order unity $\alpha$ is included in the expression for the density of geometrically necessary dislocations

$\rho_{g}=\alpha\frac{strain\ gradient}{b}$.

=== Polycrystalline material ===
Between the adjacent grains of a polycrystalline material, geometrically necessary dislocations can provide displacement compatibility by accommodating each crystal's strain gradient. Empirically, it can be inferred that such dislocations regions exist because crystallites in a polycrystalline material do not have voids or overlapping segments between them. In such a system, the density of geometrically necessary dislocations can be estimated by considering an average grain. Overlap between two adjacent grains is proportional to $\overline{\varepsilon}d$ where $\overline{\varepsilon}$ is average strain and $d$ is the diameter of the grain. The displacement $dl$ is proportional to $\overline{\varepsilon}$ multiplied by the gage length, which is taken as $d$ for a polycrystal. This divided by the Burgers vector, b, yields the number of dislocations, and dividing by the area ($\cong d^2$) yields the density

$\rho_{g}\cong\frac{\overline{\varepsilon}}{bd}$

which, with further geometrical considerations, can be refined to

$\rho_{g}=\frac{\overline{\varepsilon}}{4bd}$.

== Nye's tensor ==
Nye has introduced a set of tensor (so-called Nye's tensor) to calculate the geometrically necessary dislocation density.

For a three dimension dislocations in a crystal, considering a region where the effects of dislocations is averaged (i.e. the crystal is large enough). The dislocations can be determined by Burgers vectors. If a Burgers circuit of the unit area normal to the unit vector $l_{j}$ has a Burgers vector $B_{i}$

$B_{i}=\alpha_{ij}l_{j}$ ($i,j=1,2,3$)

where the coefficient $\alpha_{ij}$ is Nye's tensor relating the unit vector $l_{j}$ and Burgers vector $B_{i}$. This second-rank tensor determines the dislocation state of a special region.

Assume $B_{i}=b_{i}(nr_jl_{j})$, where $r$ is the unit vector parallel to the dislocations and $b$ is the Burgers vector, n is the number of dislocations crossing unit area normal to $r$. Thus, $\alpha_{ij}=nb_ir_{j}$. The total $\alpha_{ij}$ is the sum of all different values of $nb_ir_{j}$. Assume a second-rank tensor $k_{ij}$ to describe the curvature of the lattice, $d\phi_{i}=k_{ij}dx_{j}$, where $d\phi_{i}$ is the small lattice rotations about the three axes and $dx_{j}$ is the displacement vector. It can be proved that $k_{ij}=\alpha_{ji}-\tfrac{1}{2}\delta_{ij} \alpha_{kk}$where $\delta_{ij}=1$ for $i=j$, and $\delta_{ij}=0$ for $i\neq j$.

The equation of equilibrium yields $\frac{\partial \alpha_{ij}}{\partial x_j}=0$. Since $k_{ij}=\frac{\partial \phi{i}}{\partial x_j}$, thus $\frac{\partial k_{ij}}{\partial x_k}={\partial^2\over\partial x_j\partial x_k}\phi_{i}=\frac{\partial k_{ik}}{\partial x_j}$. By substituting $\alpha$ for $k$, $\frac{\partial \alpha_{ji}}{\partial x_{k}}-\frac{\partial \alpha_{ki}}{\partial x_{j}}=\frac{1}{2}(\delta_{ij}\frac{\partial \alpha_{ll}}{\partial x_{k}}-\delta_{ik}\frac{\partial \alpha_{ll}}{\partial x_{j}})$. Due to the zero solution for equations with $j=k$ are zero and the symmetry of $j$ and $k$, only nine independent equations remain of all twenty-seven possible permutations of $i,j,k$. The Nye's tensor $\alpha_{ij}$ can be determined by these nine differential equations.

Thus the dislocation potential can be written as $W=\tfrac{1}{2}\alpha_{ij}k_{ij}$, where $\frac{\partial W}{\partial k_{ij}}=\frac{1}{2}\alpha_{ij}+\frac{1}{2}\frac{\partial \alpha_{kl}}{\partial k_{ij}}k_{kl}=\frac{1}{2}\alpha_{ij}+\frac{1}{2}k_{ji}-\frac{1}{2}\delta_{ij}k_{kk}=\alpha_{ij}$.

== Measurement ==
The uniaxial tensile test has largely been performed to obtain the stress-strain relations and related mechanical properties of bulk specimens. However, there is an extra storage of defects associated with non-uniform plastic deformation in geometrically necessary dislocations, and ordinary macroscopic test alone, e.g. uniaxial tensile test, is not enough to capture the effects of such defects, e.g. plastic strain gradient. Besides, geometrically necessary dislocations are in the micron scale, where a normal bending test performed at millimeter-scale fails to detect these dislocations.

Only after the invention of spatially and angularly resolved methods to measure lattice distortion via electron backscattered diffraction by Adams et al. in 1997, experimental measurements of geometrically necessary dislocations became possible. For example, Sun et al. in 2000 studied the pattern of lattice curvature near the interface of deformed aluminum bicrystals using diffraction-based orientation imaging microscopy. Thus the observation of geometrically necessary dislocations was realized using the curvature data.

But due to experimental limitations, the density of geometrically necessary dislocation for a general deformation state was hard to measure until a lower bound method was introduced by Kysar et al. at 2010. They studied wedge indentation with a 90 degree included angle into a single nickel crystal (and later the included angles of 60 degree and 120 degree were also available by Dahlberg et al.). By comparing the orientation of the crystal lattice in the after-deformed configuration to the undeformed homogeneous sample, they were able to determine the in-plane lattice rotation and found it an order of magnitude larger than the out-of-plane lattice rotations, thus demonstrating the plane strain assumption.

The Nye dislocation density tensor has only two non-zero components due to two-dimensional deformation state and they can be derived from the lattice rotation measurements. Since the linear relationship between two Nye tensor components and densities of geometrically necessary dislocations is usually under-determined, the total density of geometrically necessary dislocations is minimized subject to this relationship. This lower bound solution represents the minimum geometrically necessary dislocation density in the deformed crystal consistent with the measured lattice geometry. And in regions where only one or two effective slip systems are known to be active, the lower bound solution reduces to the exact solution for geometrically necessary dislocation densities.

== Application ==
Because $\rho_{g}$ is in addition to the density of statistically stored dislocations $\rho_{s}$, the increase in dislocation density due to accommodated polycrystals leads to a grain size effect during strain hardening; that is, polycrystals of finer grain size will tend to work-harden more rapidly.

Geometrically necessary dislocations can provide strengthening, where two mechanisms exists in different cases. The first mechanism provides macroscopic isotropic hardening via local dislocation interaction, e.g. jog formation when an existing geometrically necessary dislocation is cut through by a moving dislocation. The second mechanism is kinematic hardening via the accumulation of long range back stresses.

Geometrically necessary dislocations can lower their free energy by stacking one atop another (see Peach-Koehler formula for dislocation-dislocation stresses) and form low-angle tilt boundaries. This movement often requires the dislocations to climb to different glide planes, so an annealing at elevated temperature is often necessary. The result is an arc that transforms from being continuously bent to discretely bent with kinks at the low-angle tilt boundaries.
