= Anthropology of technology =

Multidisciplinary field of study

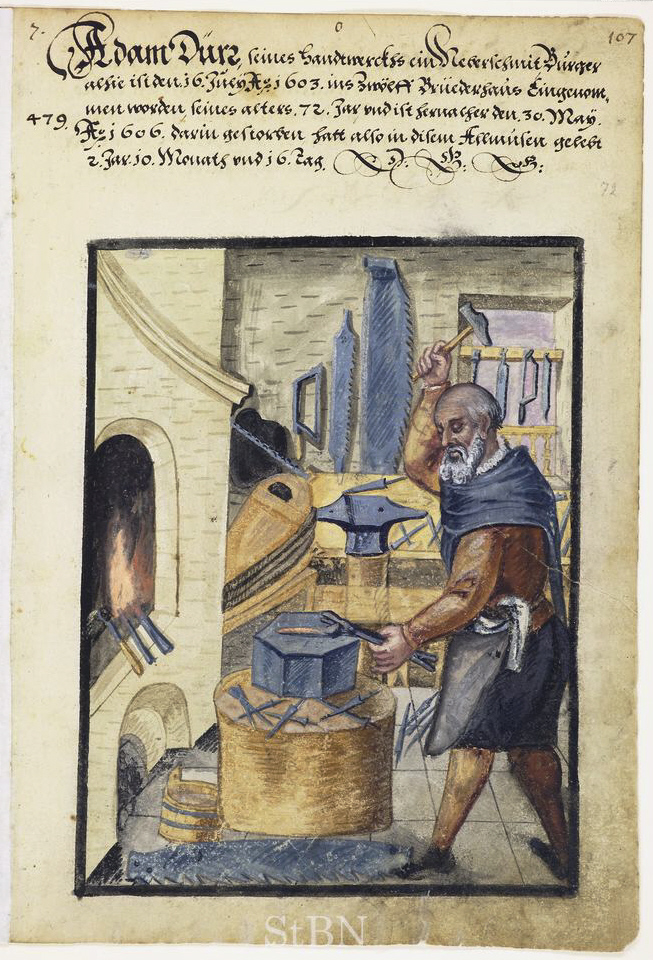
Blacksmith at work, Nuremberg c. 1606

The anthropology of technology (AoT) is a growing field of study that bears much in common with kindred developments in the sociology and history of technology: first, a growing refusal to view the role of technology in human societies as the irreversible and predetermined consequence of a given technology's putative "inner logic"; and second, a focus on the social and cultural factors that shape a given technology's development and impact in a society. However, AoT defines technology far more broadly than the sociologists and historians of technology.

AoT encompasses not only the study of the processes and products of modern science and engineering, but also the techniques of small-scale societies (such as basket-weaving and bow and arrow fabrication), and the technologies of the past recoverable only by archaeology. Methodologically, AoT shares much in common with Science and Technology Studies (STS), typically employing intensive fieldwork methodologies in order to grasp the social and cultural shaping of technological artifacts and systems. These may include a phenomenological approach: how people feel, see, sense, smell, and apprehend through the body as technology is practiced and the products used. AoT also emphasizes bodily skill and know-how; that technology cannot be practiced without the muscle memory that exists beyond the mental learning. Unique to anthropology is the growing influence of AoT theory in archaeology, a development that is raising critical questions regarding long-held theories of cultural evolution. Additionally, AoT scholars often draw inspiration from anthropological concepts and theories that are not well known to STS scholars; an example is Bryan Pfaffenberger's use of Victor Turner's social dramas theory in framing his technological dramas theory. But the overall trend is convergence rather than differentiation, as STS scholars, anthropologists, and historians of technology increasingly traverse disciplinary lines in building a larger and richer perspective on human technological activities.

Although most AoT scholars continue to employ the term “technology,” the modern use of the term often connotes the technological products of the modern industrial era. Thus the term is seen by some anthropologists to be inimical to understanding technology's social and cultural dimensions in non-industrial societies. One modern "technomyth" or dominant narrative about information technology is ‘technological determinism’, the belief that the most efficient technique (efficient in terms of the least time, energy, and cost required) will inevitably vanquish its competitors. This has led to calls for the decolonisation of such technomyths, in particular those derived from the Western world, the universalism of which "suggest that a heterogeneous set of global cultural practices have been homogenized."

Anthropologists of technology, as they study traditional activities such as pottery manufacture and use, prefer to speak of techniques or skills. Still, as historians and sociologists of modern technologies have conclusively demonstrated, these myths of technological determinism are equally inapplicable to modern science and engineering practices. Many modern technological practices are governed by social preferences rather than pure efficiency; for example, the eclipse of the efficient and practical electric automobile in favor of the gas-powered auto in the early decades of the 20th century.

== History of the Anthropology of Technology ==
Many nineteenth century anthropologists focused on technology as a mechanism for classifying and ranking human societies. A common assumption was that inventions and discoveries served to elevate societies from primitive, simple, and “savage” conditions to complex civilizations, as exemplified by the work of Lewis Henry Morgan. Debate focused on whether a specific technical practice was acquired through invention, diffusion, or migration. Ethnology museums acquired artifacts to demonstrate the stages of cultural evolution. Early twentieth century anthropologists disputed this view, noting the complexity of non-state societies in northwest Canada and the Trobriand Islands. Bronislaw Malinowski decried the “technological enthusiasms” of ethnologists, insisting that technologies in such societies should be studied holistically, as part of a complex, interdependent formation, in order to put anthropology on a more scientific footing. Nevertheless, the decades to follow in English-speaking countries saw the relegation of material culture studies to museums of ethnology, as anthropologists preferred to study cultures as mental creation. Technology was seen as a sphere largely divorced from the cultural.

=== The French Influence ===
The first steps toward today's Anthropology of Technology were undertaken by francophone anthropologists, and reflected a twentieth-century movement away from decontextualized artifacts to technical processes. Beginning in the mid-1930s, Marcel Mauss and his student Leroi-Gourhan noted that object-making techniques involving socially-learned gestures of the body are potent generators of meaning, rivaling religious ritual. From this tradition evolved a methodology, initially characteristic of the French anthropology of techniques, focusing on the chaîne opératoire, the sequence of technical actions and gestures involved in the production of an artifact. Beginning in the 1970s, French anthropologist Pierre Lemonnier, influenced in part by pioneering work in the history and sociology of technology, noted that the components of a chaîne opératoire include some “arbitrary” components not strictly required in order to ensure a successful outcome. Lemonnier and other workers in the French Techniques et culture school attributed such components to technical choices reflecting broader social and cultural factors. Yet his pioneering work, much of it written in French, remained largely inaccessible to Anglo-American anthropologists. The latter nevertheless made significant contributions to understanding the social implications of various productive processes such as irrigation, fishing, mining, and industry. Still, most English-speaking anthropologists studied the results of such processes, showing little interest in examining the technologies themselves from an anthropological point of view. At the same time, some anglophone anthropologists, exemplified by Marvin Harris and his “cultural materialism,” voiced the technological determinist view that the adoption of a given technological process inevitably produces a given social and cultural outcome.

== Recent Developments ==
The 1980s and 1990s saw significant development in Anthropology of Technology, thanks in part to pioneering developments in the history and sociology of technology. In 1988, Bryan Pfaffenberger placed emphasis on the meanings of technologies in familiarizing anthropologists with the work of sociologists and historians of technology such as Trevor Pinch, Wiebe Bijker, and Thomas Hughes, all of whom argued that the cultural meanings deeply shape the formation of technological artifacts and systems: If a technology is essentially a set of meanings and social behaviors — a point made conclusively by these scholars — then the impact of a technology is the result of one set of social behaviors on another. Technology is culture, a seamless web of activities, materials, and beliefs. In 1992, Pierre Lemonnier published Elements for an Anthropology of Technology, a work that not only introduced anglophone workers to the Techniques et culture school but also argued that the cultural shaping of technological activities occurs across the entire scope of human technological activity, spanning the fabrication of stone axes to the design of twentieth century fighter jets.

Some of the most interesting work in the Anthropology of Technology has been conducted in sub-Saharan African iron metallurgy, where local iron smelting/smithing was practiced in many areas within the memory of informants. Many of these studies illustrate the blurred line between ‘utilitarian’ and ‘expressive’ artifacts, the complex nature of the adoption of new techniques, the role of gender and ritual, and the role of new technologies in the rise of political centralization (for a wide range of examples, see Schmidt 1996). Other scholars have focused on ‘communities of practice’, the social organization of craftworkers, how knowledge is transmitted to the next generation, and the multiple social networks of craft that may cross-cut other social relations. Others focus on the differing social contexts of the adoption of a new technology; for example, Kim (2001) examined how the differing elite strategies in bronze period Denmark and southern Korea affected the adoption of iron production.

== Archaeological Applications of the Anthropology of Technology ==
Most historians and sociologists of technology have worked in industrial societies, where ample information about the thoughts and motivations of adopters and users of new technologies exist, and where the social effects of new technologies can be assessed. But how can this be done for the archaeological past, where all anthropologists have are the physical remains of artifacts? Some approaches allow at least some approximations of participant observations. These approaches rest on the concept of technical choices, the idea that any technological product can be fabricated and used in a variety of ways. Technical choices can be made among decisions about raw material, tools used to shape the raw material, the energy sources, the techniques used to manipulate the material, and the chaîne opératoire that produced the artifact. For example, one article by Ottaway sets forth all the variety of technical choices possible in copper-base metal production, and relates these choices to general cultural processes of innovation and specialization. The hope is that once the chaîne opératoire and knowledge of choices is established, then cognitive processes and cultural norms can tentatively be inferred. Establishing the choices made often requires detailed laboratory analysis of the materials to establish the irreducible properties of artifacts. For example, to alloy copper with tin requires one to be able to reach the melting point of copper (1083 °C), but this temperature can be achieved with a variety of crucibles and/or furnace structures, all of which require other technologies and choices to create—crucibles require a certain degree of fire-resistance, providing an air supply requires multiple workers at the same time, with implications for labor organization, and so on. Thus this laboratory analysis can reach beyond the laboratory to garner clues to what Pfaffenberger named the ‘sociotechnical system’, where techniques and material culture are linked to the wider social coordination of labor.

A strong example of approaches to the Anthropology of Technology using both archaeological and analytical data is found in the suite of volumes examining the ancient metallurgy of northeast Thailand, centering on the site of Ban Chiang. AOT analyses of the details of the ancient system demonstrated how a competent but decentralized metal production and manufacturing system emerged and endured over millennia, a system that served the needs of heterarchical metal age economies.

A related concept to technical choice is that of ‘technological style’, the idea that cultures have characteristic approaches to the manipulation of a wide variety of materials, approaches that can carry symbolic messages. The most famous example in the literature is Lechtman's linking of Incan techniques of gold working and textile that both share a preoccupation with ‘essence’, the design and the gold must be integral to the product: no plating or applique is allowed. Few archaeologists have established this kind of cross-material conceptual linkage, however.

Another technique to reconstruct past technologies is experimental archaeology, where modern scholars attempt to reconstruct past technological practices. This not only allows the establishment of physical requirements for manufacturing, but also offers hypotheses for the various possibilities of manufacture, along with the bodily requirements of production and use.

== The Anthropology of Technology and Emerging Technologies ==
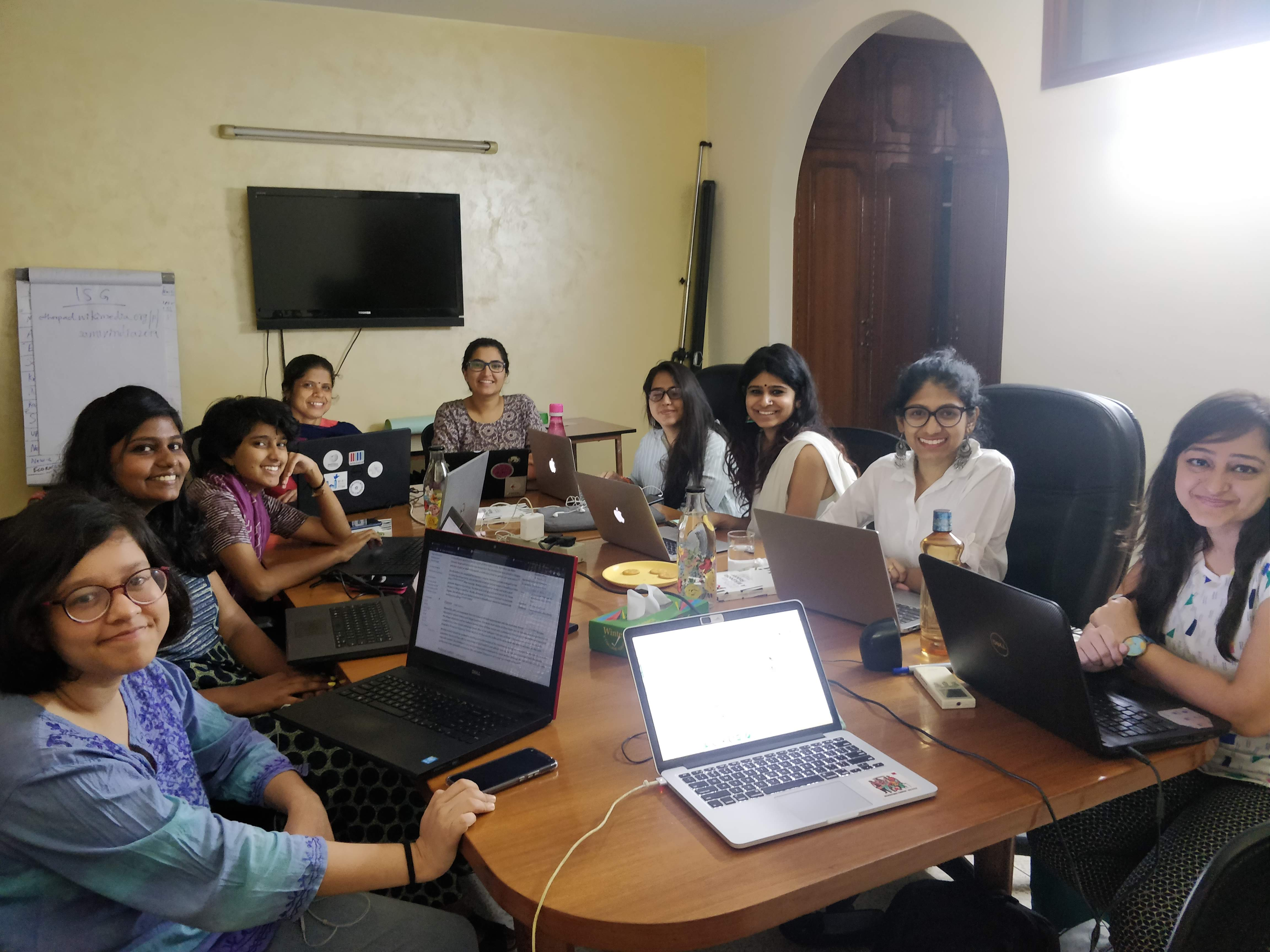
Wikipedia edit-a-thon “1Lib1Ref” in New Delhi to improve a lack of citations on Wikipedia about women in India, featured in the entry "Creative Commons, Open Access, Free / Libre / Open Source Software" in International Journal of Anthropology.

Spurring the development of AoT in the 2000s is the stunning penetration of advanced technologies throughout the world and across social divides. Most behaviors of interest to anthropologists are increasingly mediated by technologies. At the same time, there is an urgent need to develop anthropological understandings of the cultural shaping of new and emerging technologies, such as artificial intelligence. An increasing number of female scholars across anthropology and posthumanities such as Donna Haraway, Anna Tsing, Gabriella Coleman, Kit Kat Braybrooke and Silvia Lindtner have also called for a centering of feminist, posthuman, decolonial and postcapitalist perspectives in contemporary anthropological inquiries of the sociotechnical.

Anthropological studies of phenomena such as cell phone use, postgenomic sequencing, and artificial intelligence require significant methodological innovations, with anthropologists increasingly involved as consultants in design processes. Anthropological studies of digital movements such as creative commons, open access, and free/libre open-source software (FLOSS) are also increasingly integral to understanding the impact of hacker, maker and developer cultures on contemporary society - "the critical dynamics of which anthropology is especially suited for examining".

The maturity, diversity, and growth of AoT today in socio-cultural anthropology is attested by the 2022 publication of the Palgrave Handbook of the Anthropology of Technology, the first major effort to assess the field's status in a variety of areas. The papers grew out of a conference on assessing the anthropology of technology as it deals with new and emerging technologies, ranging from digital technology, new modes of human reproduction, and food infrastructure. As a result, ethnographies of non-industrial technologies, as is archaeology, are lacking in the Handbook.

== Founding scholars ==
- Marcel Mauss
- André Leroi-Gourhan
- Bronislaw Malinowski
- Pierre Lemonnier
- Marcia-Anne Dobres
- Susan Leigh Starr
- Bryan Pfaffenberger
- Michael Brian Schiffer
- Tim Ingold

== Sources ==
- Bijker, Wiebe E; Hughes, Thomas P; Pinch, Trevor J (1989). The Social Construction of Technological Systems: New Directions in the Sociology and History of Technology. Cambridge (Mass.): MIT Press. ISBN 0-262-02262-1.
- Braybrooke, Kit Kat; Jordan, Tim (2017). "Genealogy, culture and technomyth: Decolonizing Western information technologies, from Open Source to the maker movement", Digital Culture & Society, 3 (1), 25–46. doi:10.14361/dcs-2017-0103
- Braybrooke, Kit Kat (2022). "Creative Commons, Open Access, Free/Libre Open-Source Software". In Callan, Hilary; Coleman, Simon (eds). The International Encyclopedia of Anthropology (1 ed.). London: John Wiley & Sons. pp. 1–10. ISBN 978-0-470-65722-5.
- Braybrooke, Kit Kat; Smith, Adrian (2020). "Makerspaces and Peer Production: Spaces of Possibility, Tension, Post-Automation, or Liberation?" In O'Neil, Mathieu; Pentzold, Christian; Toupin, Sophie (eds.). The Handbook of Peer Production (1 ed.). London: Wiley. pp. 347–358, ISBN 978-1-119-53715-1.
- Brunn, Maja Hojer; Wahlberg, Ayo (2022). "The Anthropology of Technology: the formation of a field". In Bruun, Maja Hojer (ed.). The Palgrave Handbook of the Anthropology of Technology. Singapore: Palgrave Macmillan. pp. 1–33. ISBN 978-981-16-7083-1.
- Bunn, Stephanie (2022). "Technology as skill in handwork and craft: Basketwork and handweaving". In Bruun, Maja Hojer (ed.). The Palgrave Handbook of the Anthropology of Technology. Singapore: Palgrave Macmillan. pp. 61–83.
- Coleman, E. Gabriella (2014). Hacker, hoaxer, whistleblower, spy: the many faces of Anonymous. London: Verso. ISBN 978-1-78168-583-9.
- Coleman, E. Gabriella (2010-10-21). "Ethnographic Approaches to Digital Media". Annual Review of Anthropology. 39 (1): 487–505. doi:10.1146/annurev.anthro.012809.104945
- Dillian, Carolyn (2019). "Early Efforts in Experimental Archaeology: Examples from Evans, Pitt-Rivers, and Abbott". EXARC Journal (EXARC Journal Issue 2019/1).
- Dobres, Marcia-Anne; Hoffman, Christopher R. (1999). The Social Dynamics of Technology: Practice, Politics and World Views. Washington D.C. ISBN 1-56098-909-2.
- Epstein, Stephen M. (1993). Cultural Choice and Technological Consequences: Constraint of Innovation in the Late Prehistoric Copper Industry on Cerro Huaringa, Peru (PhD thesis). University of Pennsylvania.
- Garvey, Pauline; Miller, Daniel (2021). Ageing with Smartphones in Ireland: When life becomes craft. London: UCL Press.
- Harris, Marvin (1979). Cultural materialism: the struggle for a science of culture. New York: Random House. ISBN 978-0-394-41240-5.
- Hurcombe, Linda (2005). "Experimental Archaeology". In Renfrew, Colin; Bahn, Paul G. (eds.). Archaeology: The Key Concepts. New York: Routledge. pp. 110–115.
- Ingold, Timothy (2000). "Society, nature, and the concept of technology". In Ingold, Tim (ed.). The Perception of the Environment. London: Routledge. pp. 302–313.
- Ingold, Tim (1997). "Eight themes in the anthropology of technology. Social Analysis". The International Journal of Social and Cultural Practice. 41 (1): 106–138.
- Ingold, Tim (2001). "Beyond art and technology: the anthropology of skill". In Schiffer, Michael Brian (ed.). Anthropological Perspectives on Technology. Albuquerque: Amerind Foundation, New World Studies Series 5. University of New Mexico Press. pp. 17–45.
- Kim, Jangsuk (2001). "Elite Strategy and the Spread of Technological Innovation: The Spread of Iron in the Bronze Age Societies of Denmark and Southern Korea". Journal of Anthropological Archaeology. 20 (4): 442–478. doi:10.1006/jaar.2001.0386.
- Lechtman, Heather (1977). "Style in Technology: Some Early Thoughts". In Lechtman, H.; Merrill, R.S. (eds.). Material Culture: Style, Organization and Dynamics of Technology. St. Paul, Minn.: West Publishing.
- Lemonnier, Pierre (1986). "The Study of Material Culture today: Toward an Anthropology of Technical Systems". Journal of Anthropological Archaeology. 5 (2): 147–186. doi:10.1016/0278-4165(86)90012-7.
- Lemonnier, Pierre (1992). Elements for an Anthropology of Technology. Ann Arbor: Museum of Anthropology, University of Michigan, Anthropological Paper 88. ISBN 978-1-949098-84-6.
- Ottaway, Barbara S. (2001). "Innovation, production and specialization in early prehistoric copper metallurgy". European Journal of Archaeology. 4 (1): 87–112. doi:10.1179/eja.2001.4.1.87. S2CID 163117024.
- McGregor, G. (1987). ‘The technomyth in transition: Reading American popular culture’, Journal of American Studies, 21(3), pp. 387–409. doi:10.1017/S0021875800022891
- Pfaffenberger, Bryan (1988). "Fetished Objects and Humanised Nature: Towards an Anthropology of Technology". Man. New Series. 23 (2): 236–252. doi:10.2307/2802804. JSTOR 2802804.
- Pfaffenberger, Bryan (1992a). "Social Anthropology of Technology". Annual Review of Anthropology. 21: 491–516. doi:10.1146/annurev.an.21.100192.002423.
- Pfaffenberger, Bryan (1992b). "Technological Dramas". Science, Technology & Human Values. 17 (3): 282–312. doi:10.1177/016224399201700302. JSTOR 690096. S2CID 220875174.
- Schlanger, Nathan (2005). "The chaîne opératoire". In Renfrew, Colin; Bahn, Paul (eds.). Archaeology: the Key Concepts. Oxford: Routledge. ISBN 978-0-415-31758-0.
- Schmidt, Peter R. (1996). The culture and technology of African iron production. Gainesville: University Press of Florida. ISBN 0-8130-1384-4.
- Sigaut, F. (1994). "Technology". In Ingold, T. (ed.). Companion Encyclopedia of Anthropology. London: Routledge. pp. 420–459.
- Sillar, B.; Tite, M.S. (2001). "The Challenge of "Technological Choices" for Materials Science Approaches in Archaeology". Archaeometry. 42: 2–20. doi:10.1111/j.1475-4754.2000.tb00863.x.
- Skibo, James M.; Schiffer, Michael Brian (2008). People and things: a behavioral approach to material culture. New York: Springer. ISBN 978-0-387-76524-2.
- Smith, Merritt; Marx, Leo (1994). Does Technology Drive History?: The Dilemma of Technological Determinism. Cambridge, Mass.: MIT Press.
- Tilley, Christopher (2005). "Phenomenological Archaeology". In Renfrew, Colin; Bahn, Paul G. (eds.). Archaeology: The Key Concepts. New York: Routledge. pp. 201–207.
- Wenger, Etienne (1998). Communities of Practice: Learning, Meaning, and Identity. Cambridge UK: Cambridge University Press. ISBN 978-0-521-43017-3.
