= The Word Exchange =

2014 novel by Alena Graedon

- First edition, 2014
- Author: Alena Graedon
- Language: English
- Genre: Science fiction, thriller
- Publisher: Doubleday
- Publication date: April 8, 2014
- Publication place: United States
- Media type: Print (hardback, paperback)
- Pages: 370 pp. (hardback, first edition)
- ISBN: 978-0-38-553765-0
- OCLC: 858672441

The Word Exchange is a science fiction novel by Alena Graedon, published in 2014. It is a dystopian thriller set in the not very distant future when the printed word has nearly vanished, technology dominates, and language has become a commodity. An online "Word Exchange" has taken the effort out of looking up words, a mere convenience until real dictionaries are no longer available. Then it becomes possible to corner the market for words. The novel has been translated into eight different languages.

== Plot ==
Anana Johnson's father, world renowned linguist and Chief Editor of the North American Dictionary of the English Language, has gone missing. Doug (Douglas Samuel Johnson) was in his Manhattan office at the Dictionary seeing to the last details before the 3rd edition went to press, and then he was not. Even his name was missing from the Dictionary database, one clue among several he has left behind for his daughter.

In the post-print world of the not very distant future, Anana had been enjoying her job at the NADEL, a scholarly foundation-funded project, even though she was not much of a reader, herself. Like most people, she got all the news and narrative she wanted on her "Meme," an artificially intelligent as well as smart phone/digital assistant. She shrugged off her father's aversion to the device, because she liked hers. It had learned her preferences and mapped her life so intimately that it automatically took care of things for her, from ordering menu items or driverless car rides to downloading a definition from the Word Exchange for a word she had momentarily forgotten.

As the Diachronic Society tried to warn everyone (or all readers of the Times, at least) words were being forgotten at an alarming rate and Memes, not to mention the newer implantable device the "Nautilus," made by the same mega-corporation Synchronic were responsible. In fact, Memes were not merely dispensing information, they were spreading a virus, "word flu" at an epidemic rate. Aphasia was the first symptom of the new disease, and for those who survived the fever, also the most long-lasting.

Anana bravely, if foolishly, faces down book-burning minions, oversized Russian security guards and accusatory Diachronic Society members before she leaves her Meme behind and evades her pursuers, escaping through tunnels. She has been betrayed by her mother's boyfriend and her own ex. Bart, Ana's devoted admirer and Doug's erstwhile assistant editor, uncovers Synchronic's plot to inflate prices on the Word Exchange by polluting the Dictionary with nefarious neologisms, and he barely escapes with his life. To contain the word flu contagion, nations are closing their borders to Americans, but Ana arrives in London just in time. From there, she is followed all the way to Oxford, captured, and imprisoned in silent quarantine for three days before finding her father under the protection of the Oxford English Dictionary.

== Major themes ==
=== Information technology ===
"The Word Exchange insists readers think critically about how digital media is controlled and how language could be usurped by technology." While in the novel, dictionaries are burned, printed books usually get distributed, enabling the persistence of some copies, while the content of digital databases remain centrally controlled by publishers, hence they are subject to manipulation at the discretion of the owner. Even with "Memes" affecting the way people think and learn, the very idea of cornering the market for words depends on shifting from the immutability of printed texts to the fluidity of the all digital world. "I want my novel to be part of the ongoing conversation we’re having in our culture about the degree to which we want the intrusion of these devices into our lives," Graedon said, "because it’ll continue to happen, but we have control over it. I just wanted to offer a window onto what might happen if things went a little bit wrong."

== Development history ==
Graedon's initial inspiration for the novel was an experience while she was in college, a fire that started in a neighbor's house burned her apartment, including all her books, leading her to contemplate loss of the printed word. "Losing all my books got me thinking about the ephemerality of words and language," Graedon said, "and also the significance of these cultural artifacts such as dictionaries, and the ways in which they link us to other consciousnesses, and to the past and future." During the six years she was writing the novel, Graedon said, she had to revise constantly in order to keep up with the rapid development of technology -- "amending details to accommodate each new digital breakthrough—from self-driving automobiles, to videogame technology that allows users to move avatars with their minds, to Google Glass (which was remarkably similar to Graedon's initial iteration of the Nautilus, before she felt compelled to change it)."

== Reception ==
As the debut novel of a young author, The Word Exchange was generally praised by reviewers for its ambitious and inventive exploration of issues in language and technology. Among Booklist's "Best Crime Fiction Debuts" Bill Ott described it as "a bibliothriller of epidemic proportions … [that] offers a chilling prediction of where our unthinking reliance on technology is leading us." Liesl Schillinger in the New York Times Book Review called it, "...a nervy, nerdy dystopic thriller set in New York City in the very near future…. Clever, breathless and sportively Hegelian in theme..." On the other hand, as Rebecca Onion's review in Slate explains, about this "dazzling but unsatisfying debut novel … There's an inherent weakness in using the structure of a thriller to explore complex questions about technology and culture." At the end of the world, after all, one must join with the bookish word-loving good guys to defeat the greedy tech corporation bad guys, a pretty simple dichotomy. Colin Steele, in the Sydney Morning Herald, opined that "Graedon's narrative is littered with linguistic, literary, philosophical and musical references, but the whole ultimately never really coheres."
