= Walter Rosenhain =

Australian metallurgist

Walter Rosenhain FRS
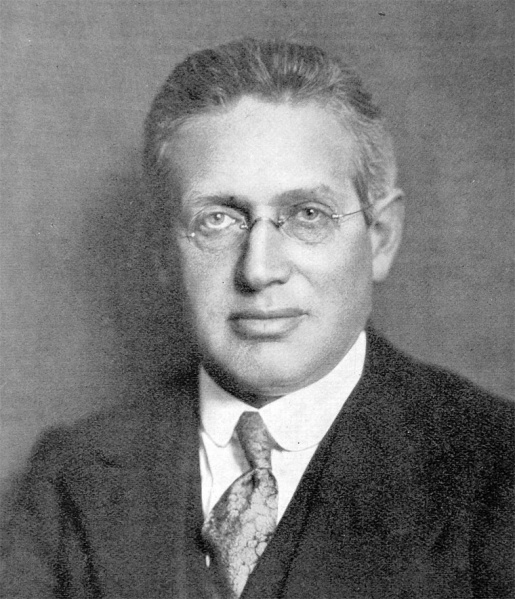
- Rosenhain in 1928
- Born: 24 August 1875; Berlin, German Empire
- Died: 17 March 1934 (aged 58); Kingston, Surrey, England
- Resting place: Putney Vale Cemetery, London
- Education: University of Melbourne; St John's College, Cambridge
- Known for: Research on crystallographic slip, physical metallurgy and aluminium alloys
- Awards: Carnegie Silver Medal (1906); Fellow of the Royal Society (1913); Bessemer Gold Medal (1930)
- Scientific career
- Fields: Metallurgy, materials science
- Workplaces: Chance Brothers; National Physical Laboratory
- Academic advisors: Alfred Ewing

Walter Rosenhain (24 August 1875 – 17 March 1934) was a German-born metallurgist who was raised and educated in Australia and spent most of his career in Britain. With James Alfred Ewing, he produced early experimental evidence that the plastic deformation of metals occurs through slip within their crystalline grains. Rosenhain helped establish physical metallurgy as a field concerned with the relationship between the microscopic structure and mechanical behaviour of metals.

From 1906 to 1931, Rosenhain directed the Department of Metallurgy and Metallurgical Chemistry at the National Physical Laboratory (NPL), where he led research on metal deformation, alloy constitution, heat treatment and metallographic methods.

== Early life and education ==
Rosenhain was born in Berlin on 24 August 1875. He was the son of Moritz Rosenhain, a merchant, and Friederike Rosenhain, whose father was Rabbi Benjamin Yosman Fink. His family migrated to Melbourne when he was five, partly to prevent him from later becoming liable for Prussian military service. He attended Wesley College, Melbourne, and studied physics and engineering at Queen's College, University of Melbourne.

After completing his engineering studies with honours in 1896, Rosenhain received an 1851 Exhibition Scholarship. He travelled to Britain in 1897 and entered St John's College, Cambridge, where he studied under the engineer and physicist James Ewing.

== Career ==
=== Research at Cambridge and Chance Brothers ===
At Cambridge, Ewing suggested that Rosenhain examine polished metal specimens under a microscope while mechanically deforming them. During these experiments, sharply defined lines appeared within individual crystalline grains. Their direction differed between grains, and additional systems of lines appeared as the deformation increased. Ewing and Rosenhain interpreted the lines as surface steps produced when parts of a crystal slipped along parallel planes.

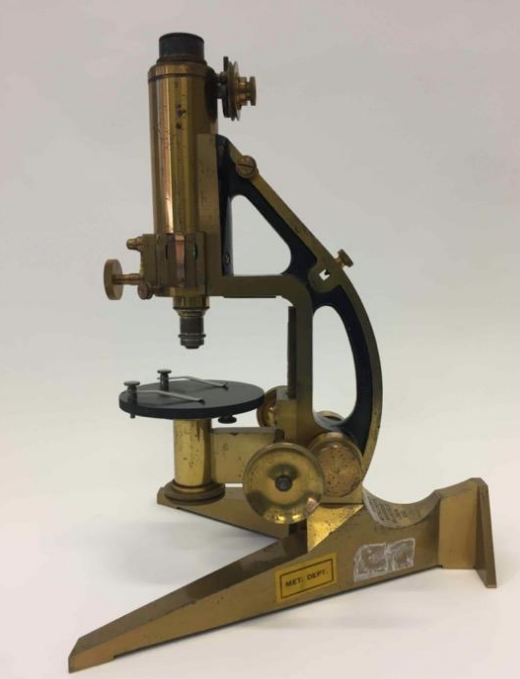
Rosenhain metallurgical microscope

Their results showed that metals consist of crystalline grains and that permanent deformation can occur through discrete slips without destroying the crystalline structure. Ewing and Rosenhain presented the research in the 1899 Bakerian Lecture, later published as "The Crystalline Structure of Metals". Rosenhain subsequently produced cross-sections of deformed surfaces that showed the steps in profile and measured whether the material between them had become distorted.

In 1900, Rosenhain joined Chance Brothers at Smethwick, near Birmingham, as a scientific adviser. His work there concerned optical glass and lighthouse equipment. He continued his metallurgical research in a private laboratory at his home and published Glass Manufacture in 1908.

Rosenhain also redesigned the metallurgical microscope. His design used a rigid body, a movable specimen stage and illumination suited to polished metal surfaces. The instrument was manufactured by R. & J. Beck from 1906 and remained in production in modified forms for several decades.

=== National Physical Laboratory ===
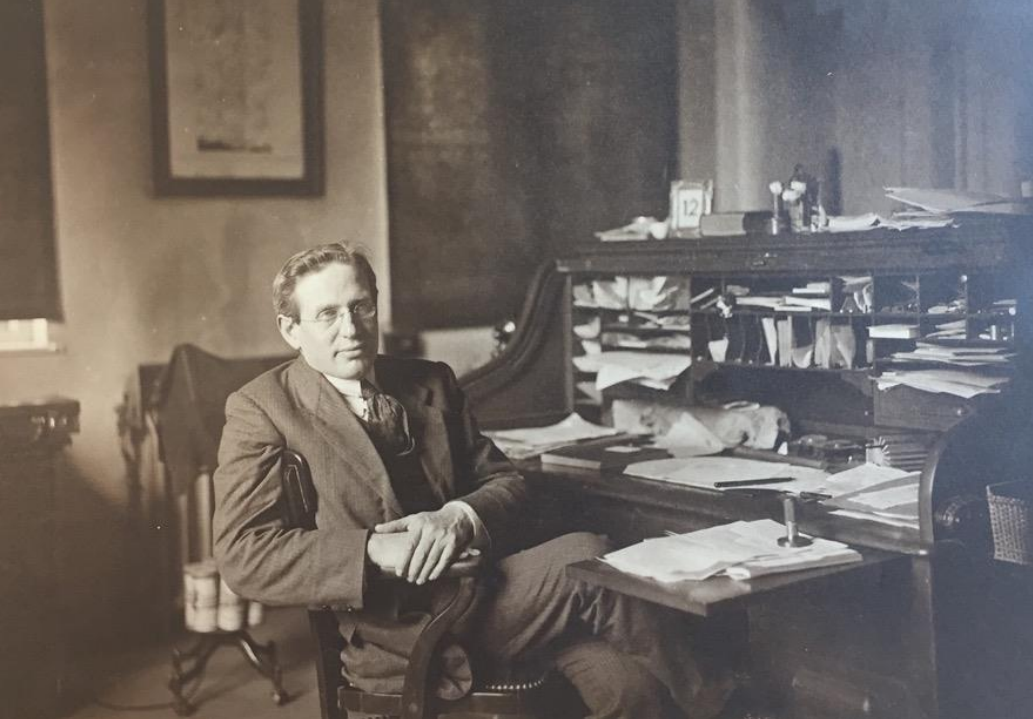
Walter Rosenhain at NPL

In 1906, Rosenhain became superintendent of NPL Department of Metallurgy and Metallurgical Chemistry. He held the post for 25 years. During this period, the department expanded from 4 employees to about 70 and acquired dedicated laboratories, a foundry, a rolling mill and workshops.

Rosenhain combined fundamental research with work directed towards industrial problems. His department studied copper, aluminium, zinc, steel alloys, using metals and refractory materials of unusually high purity for the period. It also developed furnaces and analytical methods for determining alloy equilibrium diagrams at high temperatures.

During the First World War, the department concentrated on lightweight alloys for aircraft and engines. Its investigations produced Y alloy, an aluminium alloy containing copper, nickel and magnesium. After suitable heat treatment, the alloy retained useful mechanical properties at elevated temperatures and was adopted for forgings and engine components.

In 1915, Marie Laura Violet Gayler and Isabel Hadfield became the first women appointed to the scientific staff of Rosenhain’s department. Gayler later contributed to research on aluminium age hardening and dental amalgams.

== Scientific work ==
Rosenhain’s research covered the deformation, fracture, recrystallisation and heat treatment of metals. His early work with Ewing established the significance of slip bands in plastic deformation. He later examined how deformation affected iron and steel, including the relationship between temperature, fracture and grain boundaries.

He proposed that an amorphous, glass-like material existed between crystalline grains and used this hypothesis to explain intergranular fracture and high-temperature creep. The proposal generated extensive debate and experimental investigation but did not become the accepted account of grain-boundary structure.

Rosenhain also studied how dissolved alloying elements increase the hardness of a metal. He related this effect to distortion of the crystal lattice and examined the association between solid solubility and hardening. At NPL, he directed systematic studies of iron combined with oxygen, silicon, chromium, phosphorus and manganese.

His experimental inventions included a gradient furnace for producing controlled cooling rates, a plotting chronograph for recording thermal changes and high-temperature furnaces for metallurgical research. For the microscopic study of dental amalgams, he developed methods for polishing, etching and photographing specimens at temperatures near −60 °C, which prevented the mercury-containing material from changing during examination.

Rosenhain’s books included Glass Manufacture (1908) and An Introduction to the Study of Physical Metallurgy (1914). The latter presented metallography as a study of the structure and physical behaviour of metals rather than primarily as a branch of analytical chemistry, and was widely used in metallurgical education.

== Honours and legacy ==
Rosenhain was elected a Fellow of the Royal Society in 1913. He received the Iron and Steel Institute’s Carnegie Silver Medal in 1906 for his research on deformation and fracture in iron and steel, and its Bessemer Gold Medal in 1930.

He served as president of the Institute of Metals from 1928 to 1930 and was active in the Optical Society. He represented Britain in the International Association for Testing Materials and became its president in 1931. He also served on committees concerned with aeronautics, industrial research, dental materials and technical standards.

Rosenhain retired from NPL in 1931 and became a consulting metallurgist in London.

Histories of metallurgy credit Rosenhain with helping to move the discipline from chemical classification towards the experimental study of metallic structure and mechanical behaviour. His organisation of team research at NPL also contributed to its development as an international centre for physical metallurgy.

The Institute of Materials, Minerals and Mining awards the Rosenhain Medal and Prize for achievement in materials science.

== Personal life and death ==
On 4 December 1901, Rosenhain married Louise Monash, the sister of Australian engineer and military commander John Monash. The couple had three daughters. Although Rosenhain was not a practising Jew, he resigned from several German scientific societies during the early years of the Nazi government in protest against its treatment of Jewish people.

Rosenhain died from cancer at his home in Kingston, Surrey, on 17 March 1934. He was buried at Putney Vale Cemetery.

== Selected works ==
- Ewing, James Alfred; Rosenhain, Walter (1900). "Bakerian Lecture: The Crystalline Structure of Metals". Philosophical Transactions of the Royal Society of London, Series A. 193 (193): 353–375. Bibcode:1900RSPTA.193..353E. doi:10.1098/rsta.1900.0011.
- Rosenhain, Walter (1908). Glass Manufacture. London: Archibald Constable.
- Rosenhain, Walter (1914). An Introduction to the Study of Physical Metallurgy. London: Constable.
