= Artificial Intelligence Appreciation Day =

Annual AI ethics observance

AI Appreciation Day is a holiday that occurs on July 16th each year and is meant to showcase the impact of artificial intelligence and drive conversation regarding its ethical use-cases. The Day was founded by Jason Kirton on July 16th, 2021, after he filed the holiday with the National Day Archives via his LLC called A.I. Heart.

Artificial Intelligence Appreciation Day (AI Day) has gained global momentum over the years, from articles in the United States in publications like Forbes Magazine Online to being written about in India in major news publications like Khaleej Times.

== See also ==
- Artificial intelligence ethics
- Technology and society
