= Brian Bowsher =

British chemist

Brian Robert Bowsher OBE FRSC FInstP (born 12 July 1957) is a British chemist, and was the Chief Executive of the Science and Technology Facilities Council (STFC) between November 2016 and March 2018. He is also a non-executive member of the board for the Defence Science and Technology Board (Dstl).

== Early life ==
He was born in Birmingham. He attended Handsworth Grammar School then Fosters Grammar School (now Foster's School) in Dorset. From the University of Southampton he obtained a BSc degree in Chemistry in 1978 and then received a PhD degree in 1981.

== Career ==
He was Managing Director of the National Physical Laboratory from 2009 to 2015. From 2002 to 2009 he had various division-head and director roles at the Atomic Weapons Establishment.

== Personal life ==
He married Sally Smith in 1987 and they have one son. He lives in Wareham, Dorset.

Government offices
Preceded by John Womersley	Chief Executive of STFC; November 2016 - March 2018	Succeeded by Mark Thomson
Preceded by Martyn Sené	Managing Director of the National Physical Laboratory; 2009 - 2015	Succeeded by Peter Thompson
