= National Physical Laboratory (United Kingdom) =

National measurement institution of the UK

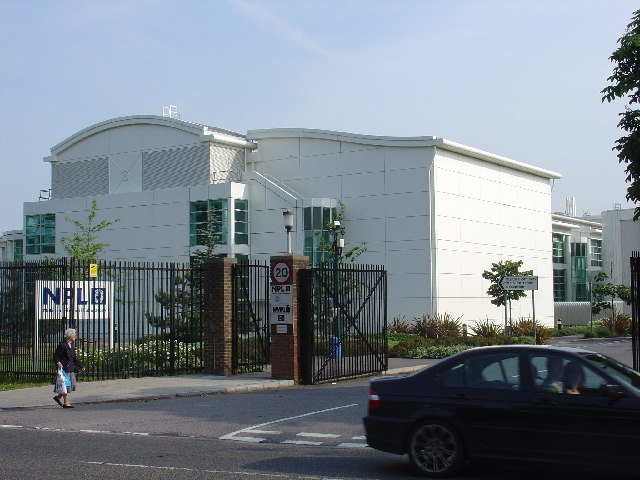
- NPL's main entrance on Hampton Road
- Established: 1900; 126 years ago
- Research type: Applied Physics
- Field of research: Metrology
- Chief Executive Officer: Peter Thompson
- Staff: c. 1,450
- Location: Hampton Road, Teddington, TW11 0LW, England, UK; 51°25′35″N 0°20′37″W
- Operating agency: NPL Management Ltd for the Department for Business, Innovation, Science and Trade
- Website: www.npl.co.uk

The National Physical Laboratory (NPL) is the national measurement standards laboratory of the United Kingdom. It sets and maintains physical standards for British industry.

Founded in 1900, the NPL is one of the oldest metrology institutes in the world. Research and development work at the laboratory has contributed to the advancement of many disciplines of science, including the development of early computers in the late 1940s and 1950s, construction of the first accurate atomic clock in 1955, and the invention and first implementation of packet switching in the 1960s, which is today one of the fundamental technologies of the Internet. The former heads of NPL include many individuals who were pillars of the British scientific establishment.

NPL is based at Bushy Park in Teddington, a suburb in the Richmond upon Thames borough of south-western Greater London. It is operated by NPL Management Ltd, a company owned by the Department for Business, Innovation, Science and Trade, and is one of the most extensive government laboratories in the United Kingdom.

== History ==
=== Precursors ===
In the 19th century, the Kew Observatory was run by self-funded devotees of science. In the early 1850s, the observatory began charging fees for testing meteorological instruments and other scientific equipment. As universities in the United Kingdom created and expanded physics departments, the governing committee of the observatory became increasingly dominated by paid university physicists in the last two decades of the nineteenth century. By this time, instrument-testing was the observatory's main role. Physicists sought the establishment of a state-funded scientific institution for testing electrical standards.

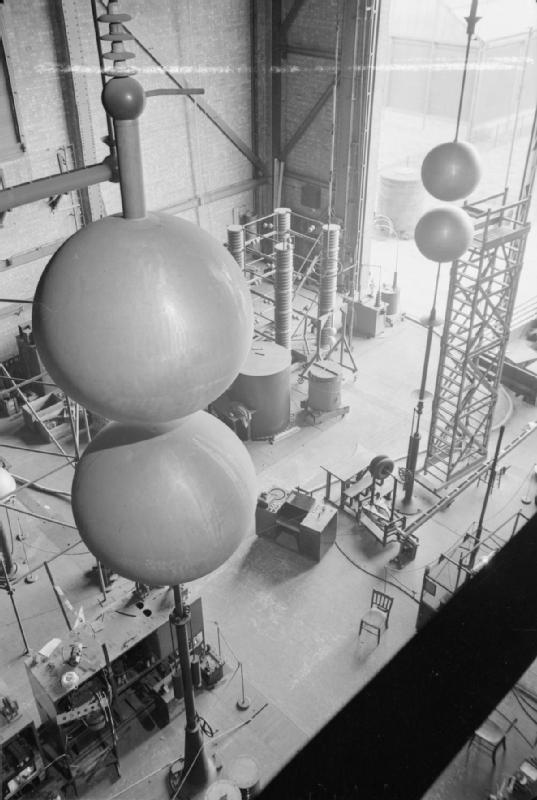
The Electricity Division of the National Physical Laboratory in 1944

=== Founding ===
The National Physical Laboratory was established in 1900 at Bushy House in Teddington. Its purpose was "for standardising and verifying instruments, for testing materials, and for the determination of physical constants". The laboratory was run by the UK government, with members of staff being part of the civil service. It grew to fill a large selection of buildings on the Teddington site.

=== Late 20th century ===
Administration of NPL was contracted out in 1995 under a Government Owned Contractor Operated (GOCO) model, via a new operating company, NPL Management Ltd. Serco won the bid and all staff transferred to their employment. Under this regime, overhead costs halved, third-party revenues grew by 16% per annum, and the number of peer-reviewed research papers published doubled.

NPL procured a large state-of-the-art laboratory under a Private Finance Initiative contract in 1998. The construction was undertaken by John Laing.

=== 21st century ===
The new laboratory building, which had been maintained by Serco, was transferred back to the DTI in 2004 after the private sector companies involved made losses of over £100M.

It was decided in 2012 to change the operating model for NPL from 2014 onwards to include academic partners and to establish a postgraduate teaching institute on site. The date of the changeover was later postponed for a year. The candidates for lead academic partner were the Universities of Edinburgh, Southampton, Strathclyde and Surrey with an alliance of the Universities of Strathclyde and Surrey chosen as preferred partners.

Funding was announced in January 2013 for a new £25M Advanced Metrology Laboratory that will be built on the footprint of an existing unused building.

NPL Management Ltd and the operation of the laboratory transferred back to the Department for Business, Innovation and Skills (now the Department for Science, Innovation and Technology) on 1 January 2015.

== Notable researchers ==
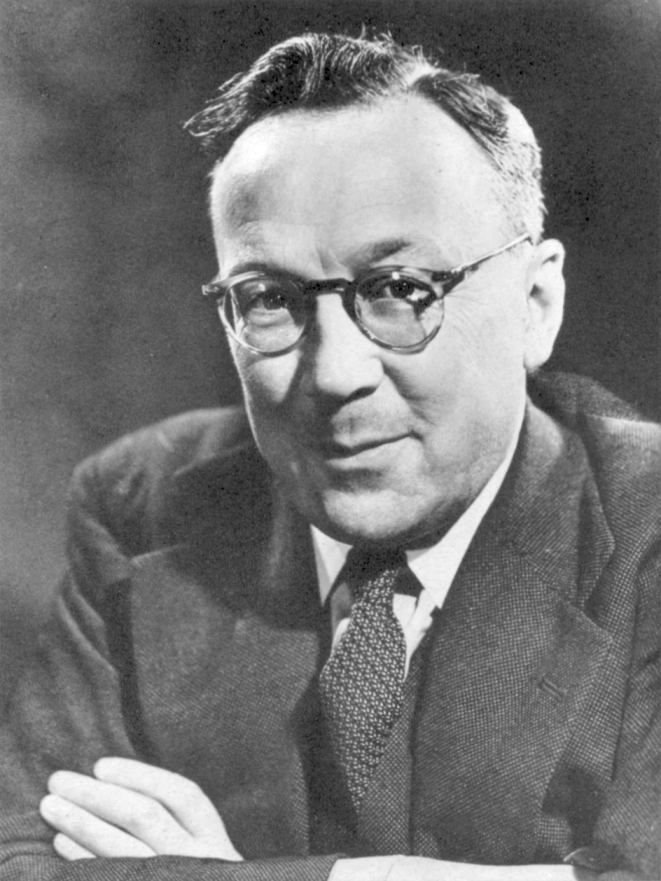
Robert Watson-Watt

Researchers who have worked at NPL include: D. W. Dye who did important work in developing the technology of quartz clocks; the inventor Sir Barnes Wallis who did early development work on the "Bouncing Bomb" used in the "Dam Busters" wartime raids; H. J. Gough, one of the pioneers of research into metal fatigue, who worked at NPL for 19 years from 1914 to 1938; and Sydney Goldstein and Sir James Lighthill who worked in NPL's aerodynamics division during World War II researching boundary layer theory and supersonic aerodynamics respectively.

Alan Turing, known for his work at the Government Code and Cypher School (GC&CS) at Bletchley Park during the Second World War to decipher German encrypted messages, worked at the National Physical Laboratory from 1945 to 1947. He designed there the ACE (Automatic Computing Engine), which was one of the first designs for a stored-program computer. Clifford Hodge also worked there and was engaged in research on semiconductors. Others who have spent time at NPL include Robert Watson-Watt, generally considered the inventor of radar; Oswald Kubaschewski, the father of computational materials thermodynamics; Albert Uttley, a pioneering cyberneticist; and the numerical analyst James Wilkinson.

Metallurgist Walter Rosenhain appointed the NPL's first female scientific staff members in 1915, Marie Laura Violet Gayler and Isabel Hadfield.

== Research ==
NPL research has contributed to physical science, materials science, computing, and bioscience. Applications have been found in ship design, aircraft development, radar, computer networking, and global positioning.

=== Atomic clocks ===
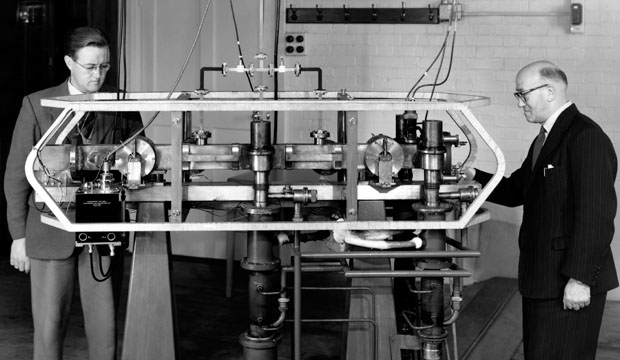
Louis Essen at right, with Jack Perry

The first accurate atomic clock, a caesium standard based on a certain transition of the caesium-133 atom, was built by Louis Essen and Jack Parry in 1955 at NPL. Calibration of the caesium standard atomic clock was carried out by the use of the astronomical time scale ephemeris time (ET). This led to the internationally agreed definition of the latest SI second being based on atomic time. The NPL-CsF2 and NPL-CsF3 are still being used today as frequency reference in universal time coordination.

=== Computing ===
==== Early computers ====
NPL has undertaken pioneering computer research since the mid-1940s. From 1945, Alan Turing led the design of the Automatic Computing Engine (ACE) computer. The ACE project was overambitious and floundered, leading to Turing's departure. Donald Davies took over the project and concentrated on delivering the less ambitious Pilot ACE computer, which first worked in May 1950. Among those who worked on the project was American computer pioneer Harry Huskey. A commercial spin-off, DEUCE was manufactured by English Electric Computers and became one of the best-selling machines of the 1950s.

==== Packet switching ====
Beginning in the mid-1960s, Donald Davies invented and pioneered the implementation of packet switching, now the dominant basis for data communications in computer networks worldwide. Davies designed and proposed a national commercial data network in his 1965 Proposal for the Development of a National Communications Service for On-line Data Processing. Subsequently, the NPL team, led by Roger Scantlebury, were the first to implement packet switching in the local-area NPL network in early 1969, which operated until 1986. They carried out work to simulate the performance of a wide-area packet-switched network capable of providing data communications to most of the U.K. Their research and practice influenced the ARPANET in the United States, the forerunner of the Internet, and other researchers in the UK and Europe, including Louis Pouzin, as well as in Japan.

NPL sponsors a gallery, opened in 2009, about the development of packet switching and "Technology of the Internet" at The National Museum of Computing.

==== Internetworking ====
NPL internetworking research was led by Davies, Derek Barber and Scantlebury, who were members of the International Network Working Group (INWG). They observed that connecting heterogeneous computer networks creates a "basic dilemma" since a common host protocol would require restructuring the existing networks. To study this, NPL connected with the European Informatics Network (Barber directed the project and Scantlebury led the UK technical contribution) by translating between two different host protocols; that is, using a gateway. Concurrently, the NPL connection to the Post Office Experimental Packet Switched Service used a common host protocol in both networks. NPL research confirmed establishing a common host protocol would be more reliable and efficient. The EIN protocol helped to launch the proposed INWG standard. Bob Kahn and Vint Cerf acknowledged Davies and Scantlebury in their 1974 paper "A Protocol for Packet Network Intercommunication". Barber was involved in Internet design discussions in 1980.

==== Scrapbook ====
Scrapbook was an information storage and retrieval system that went live in mid-1971. It included what would now be called word processing, e-mail and hypertext, anticipating many elements of the World Wide Web. The project was managed by David Yates who said of it "We had a community of bright people that were interested in new things, they were good fodder for a system like Scrapbook" and "When we had more than one Scrapbook system, hyperlinks could go across the network without the user knowing what was happening". It was decided that any commercial development of Scrapbook should be left to industry and it was licensed to Triad and then to BT who marketed it as Milepost and developed a transaction processor as an additional feature. Various implementations were marketed on DEC, IBM and ITL machines. All NPL implementations of Scrapbook were closed down in 1984.

==== Email ====
Derek Barber proposed a network mail protocol and implemented it on the EIN in 1979, the first European implementation of electronic mail. (Note: UCL implemented network mail on its connection to the ARPANET in 1974.) Jon Postel referenced Barber's work in his first paper on Internet email, published in the Internet Experiment Note series.

==== Secure communication ====
In the early 1990s, the NPL developed three formal specifications of the MAA: one in Z, one in LOTOS, and one in VDM. The VDM specification became part of the 1992 revision of the International Standard 8731–2, and three implementations in C, Miranda, and Modula-2.

=== Electromagnetics ===
A 2020 study by researchers from Queen Mary University of London and NPL successfully used microwaves to measure blood-based molecules known to be influenced by dehydration.

=== Metrology ===
The National Physical Laboratory is involved with new developments in metrology, such as researching metrology for, and standardising, nanotechnology. It is mainly based at the Teddington site, but also has a site in Huddersfield for dimensional metrology and an underwater acoustics facility at Wraysbury Reservoir near Heathrow Airport.

=== Timing ===
The National Timing Centre (NTC) Programme has been developed to provide a time infrastructure system for research and technology. In 2025, £68 million was awarded to the National Physical Laboratory to further develop the NTC.

== Directors of NPL ==
Directors of NPL
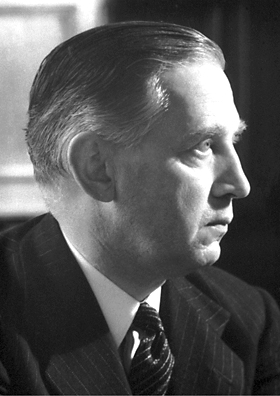
E. V. Appleton

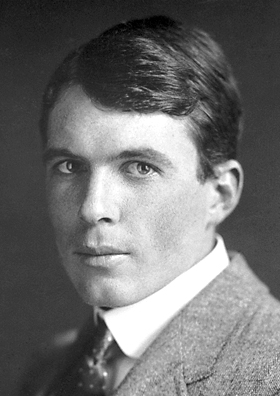
W. L. Bragg

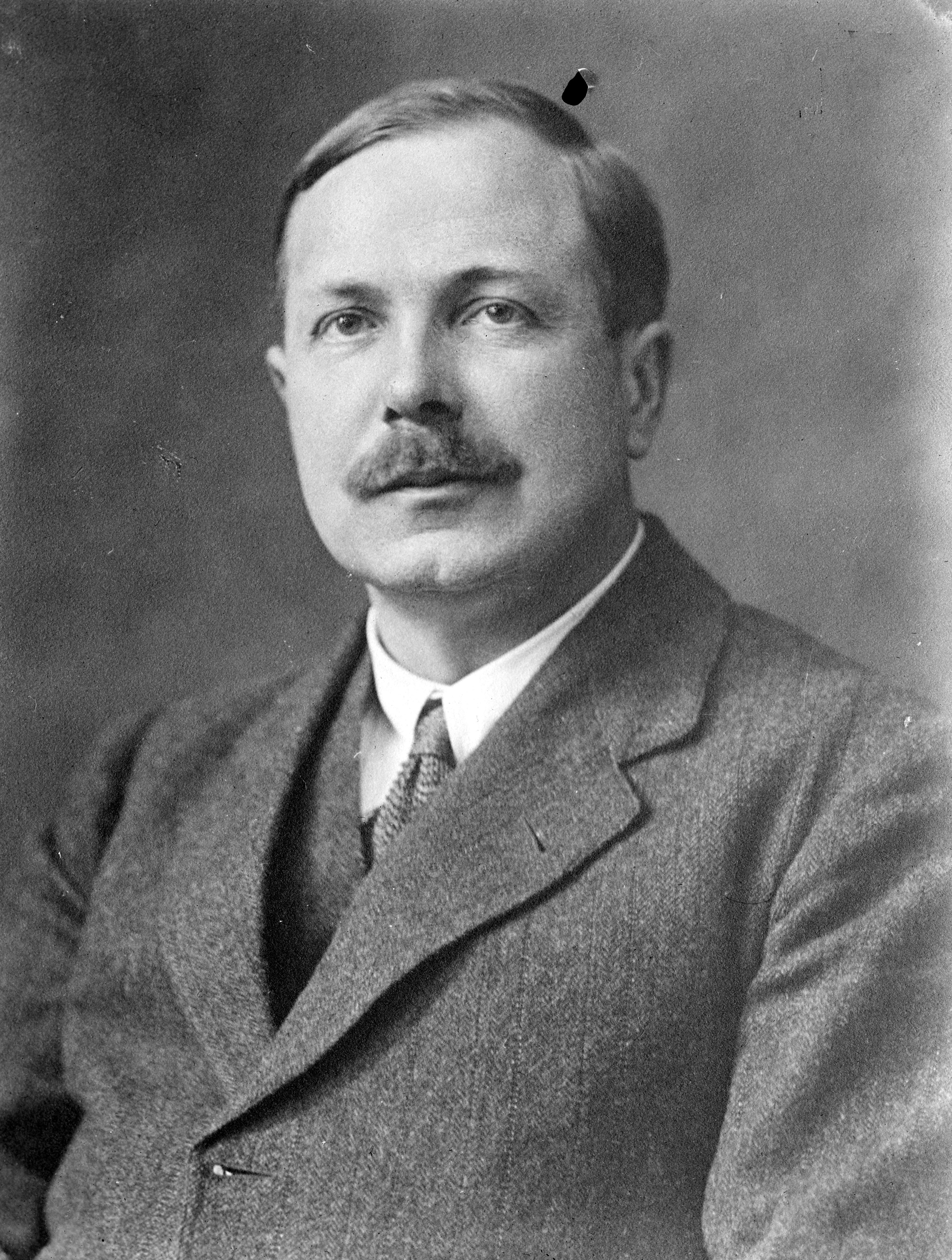
C. G. Darwin

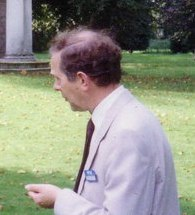
Peter Clapham

Directors of NPL include a number of notable individuals:

- Sir Richard Tetley Glazebrook, 1900–1919
- Sir Joseph Ernest Petavel, 1919–1936
- Sir Frank Edward Smith, 1936–1937 (acting)
- Sir William Lawrence Bragg, 1937–1938
- Sir Charles Galton Darwin, 1938–1949
- Sir Edward Victor Appleton, 1941 (acting)
- Sir Edward Crisp Bullard, 1948–1955
- Reginald Leslie Smith-Rose, 1955–1956 (acting)
- Sir Gordon Sutherland, 1956–1964
- John Vernon Dunworth, 1964–1977
- Paul Dean, 1977–1990
- Peter Clapham, 1990–1995

Managing directors

- John Rae, 1995–2000
- Bob McGuiness, 2000–2005
- Steve McQuillan, 2005–2008
- Martyn Sené, 2008–2009, 2015 (acting)
- Brian Bowsher, 2009–2015

Chief executive officers

- Peter Thompson, 2015–present

== NPL buildings ==
NPL buildings

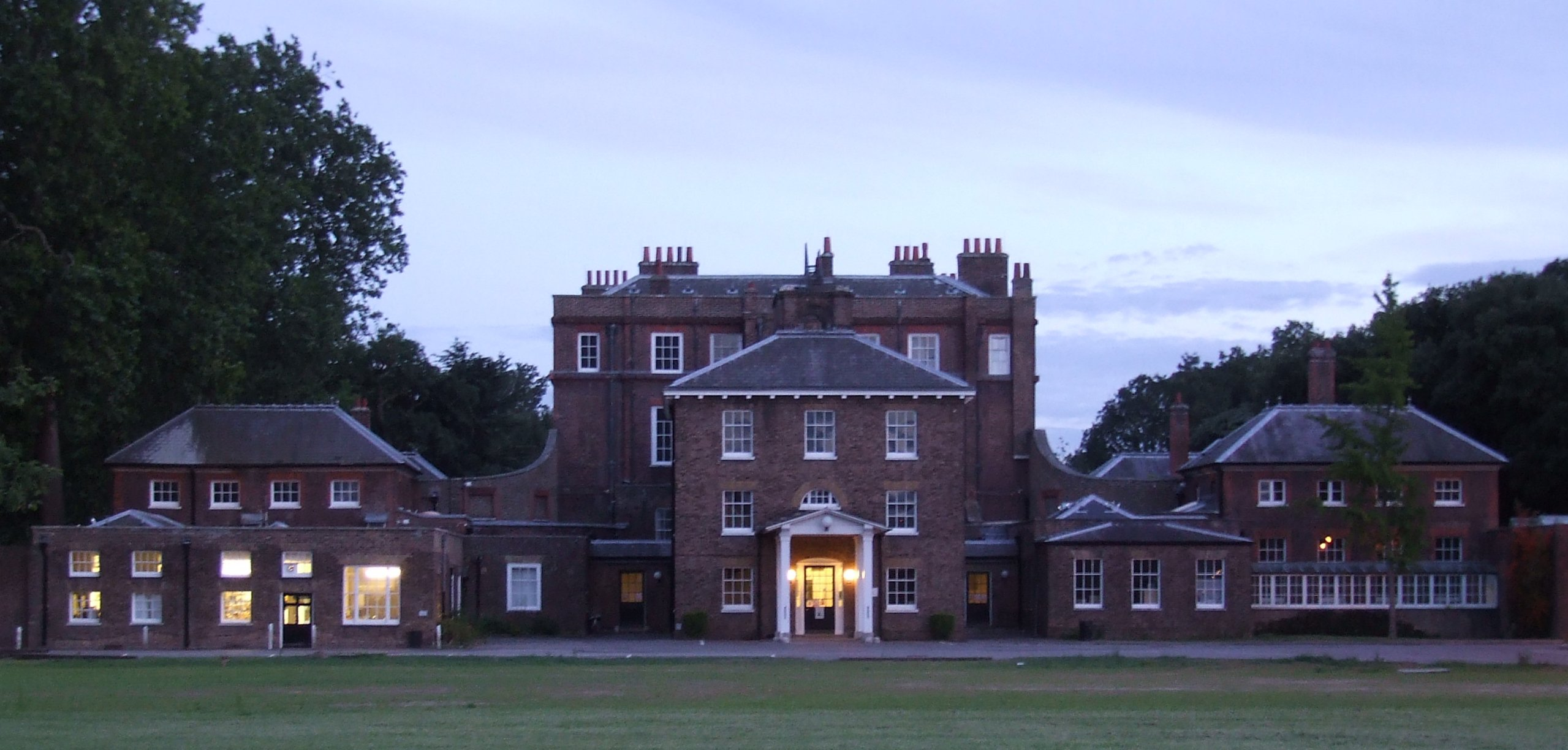
Bushy House

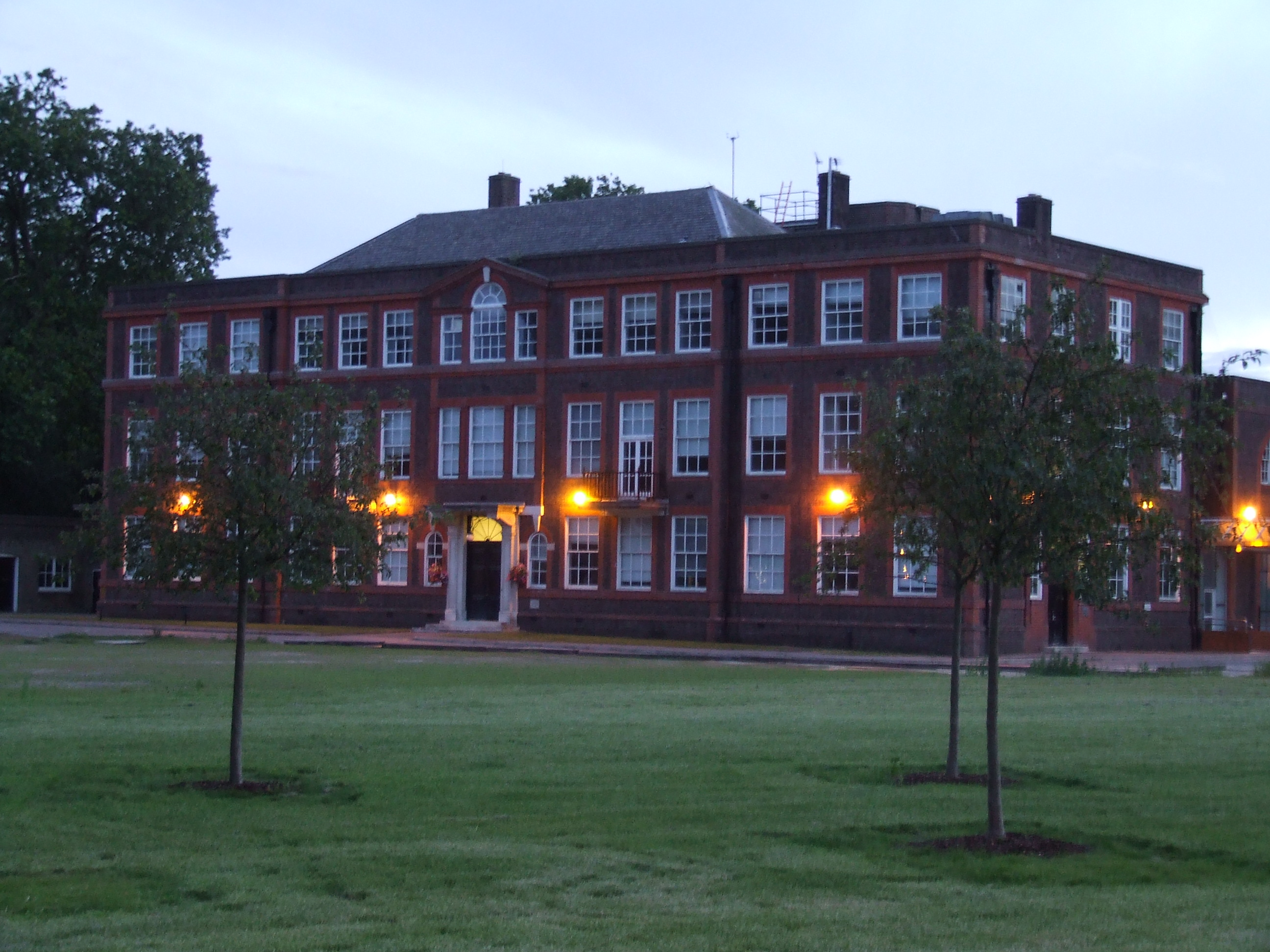
The Darwin building

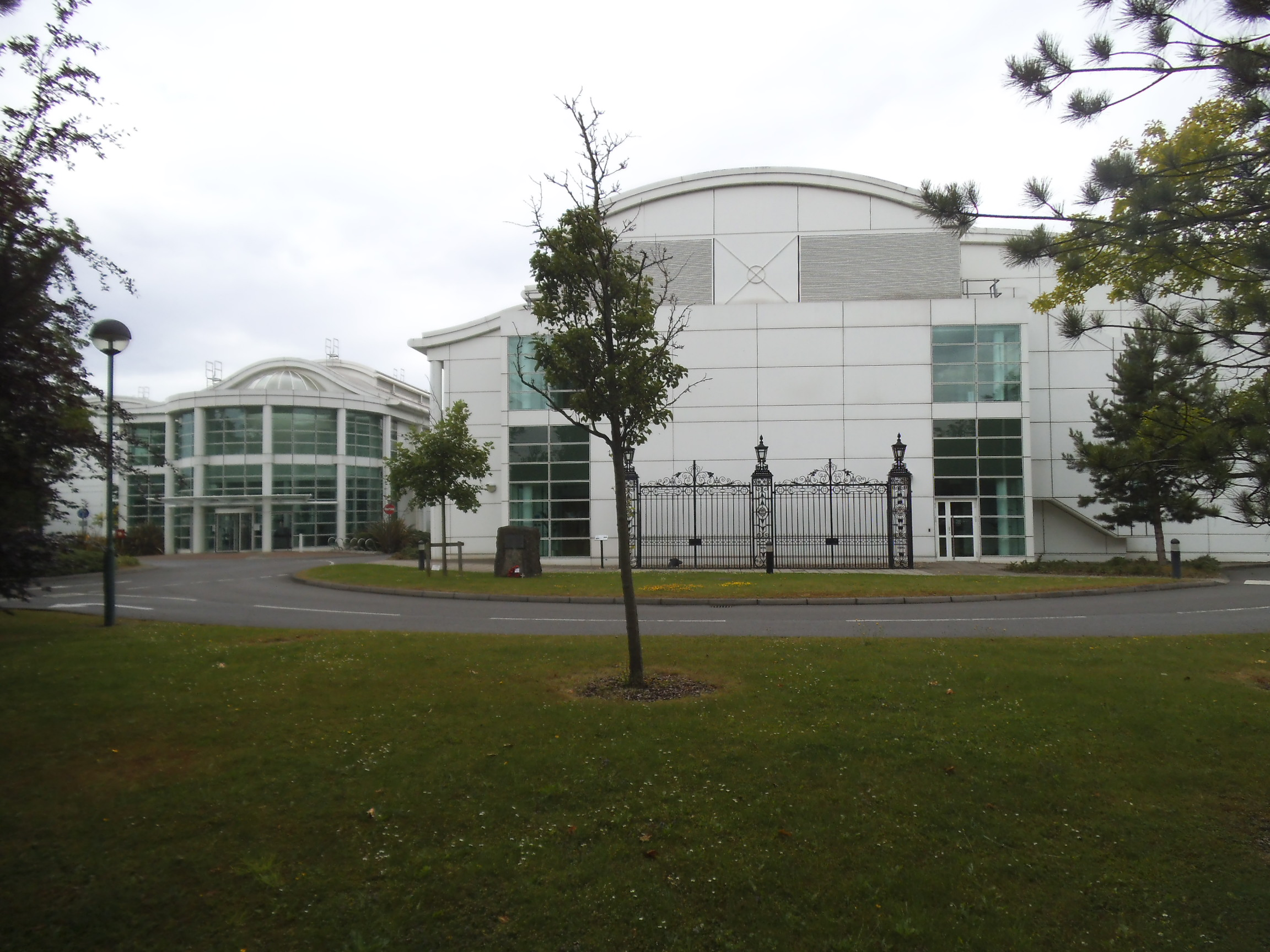
New building with preserved gates from the original entrance on Queen's Road

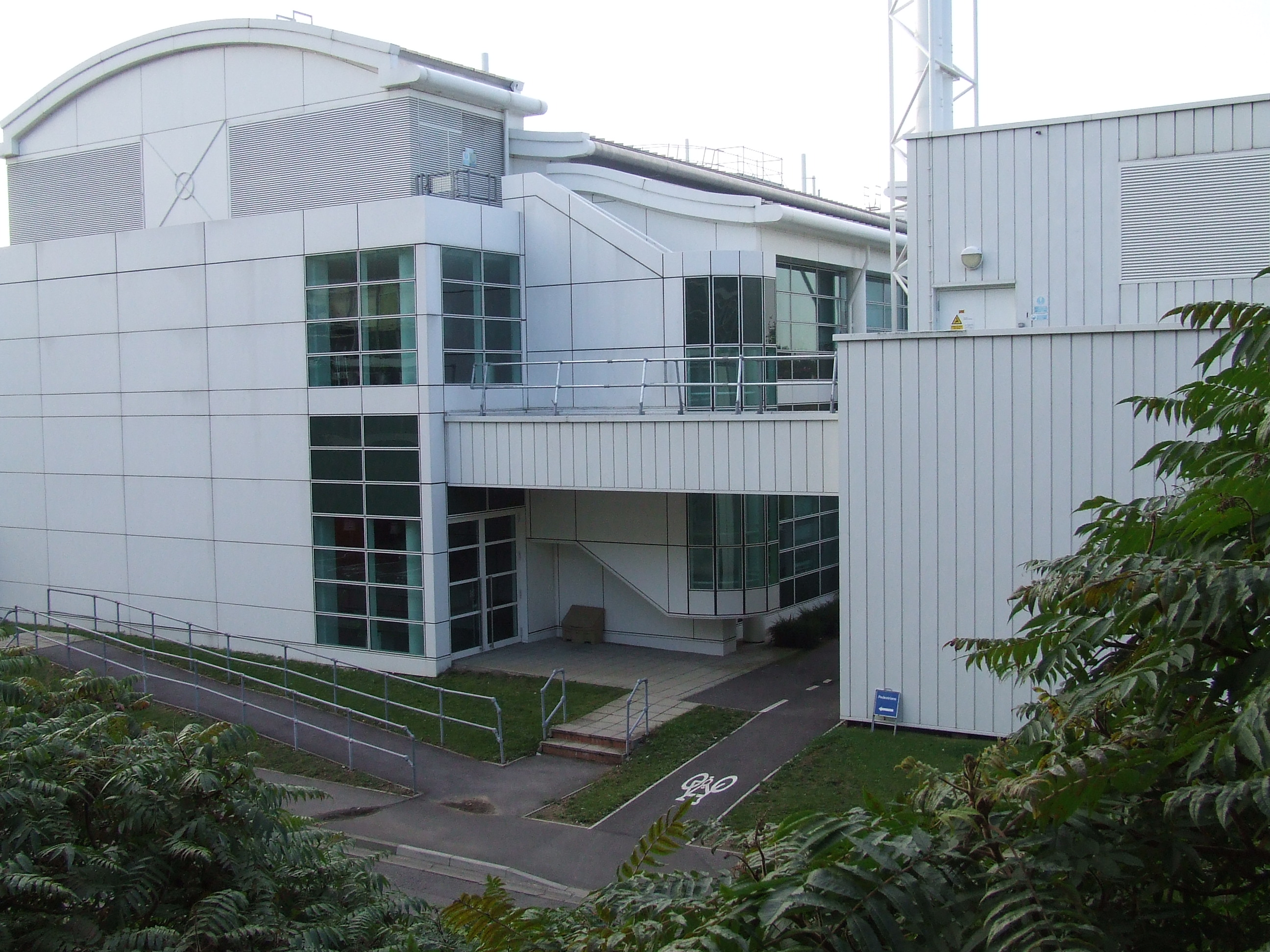
Part of the new building

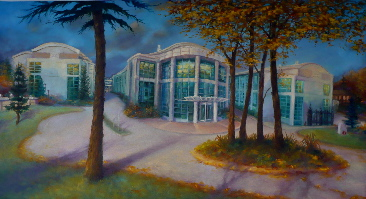
Painting of the laboratory by Lee Campbell, resident artist there in 2009

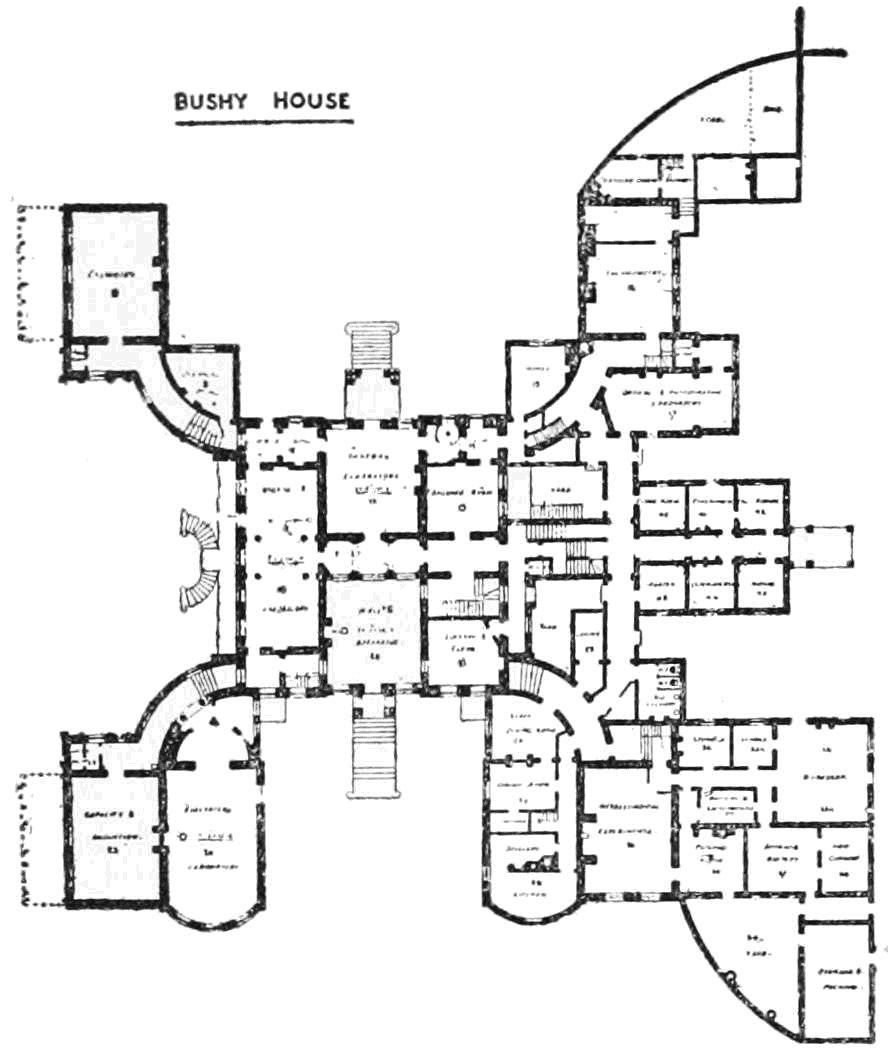
Ground floor plan of Bushy House in 1901/1902

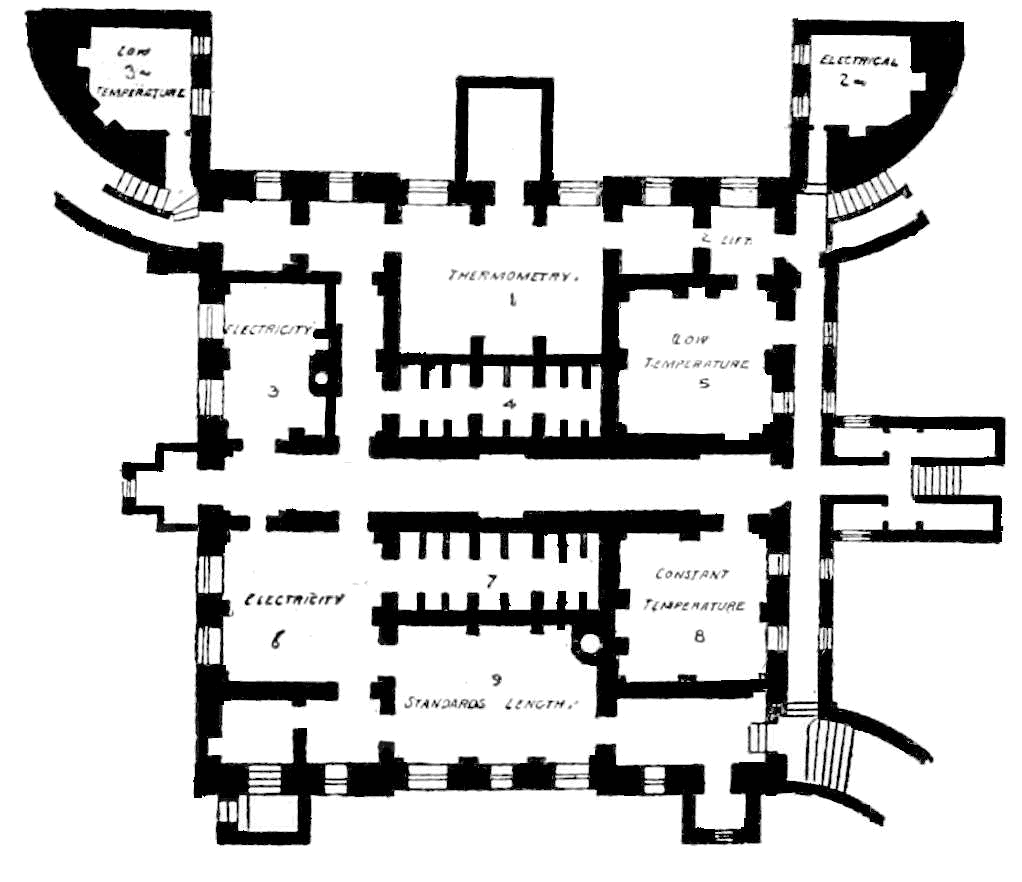
Basement plan of Bushy House in 1901/1902

== See also ==
- Outline of metrology and measurement
- List of UK government scientific research institutes
- National Institute of Standards and Technology in the United States
- National Physical Laboratory of India
- VAMAS
