= Marie Laura Violet Gayler =

- Born: 25 March 1891; Bristol
- Died: 2 August 1976 (aged 85); Winchester
- Occupation: Metallurgist
- Employer: National Physical Laboratory

Marie Laura Violet Gayler (25 March 1891 – 2 August 1976) was an English Metallurgist whose most notable contributions to her field were in the areas of Aluminium alloys and dental amalgams. She spent most of her career at the National Physical Laboratory, where she, along with Isabel Hadfield, were the first women to be appointed as staff in the department of metallurgy.

== Early life ==
Marie Laura Violet Gayler was born in Bristol on 25 March 1891, the youngest of five daughters. Her parents were William Gayler, Director of Stamps and Excise at Somerset House and Ellen Amelia Chrismas, an artist, recipient of the Queen's Gold Medal from the Slade School in 1880 and whose work was exhibited at the Royal Academy.

== Education ==
Marie Gayler was educated at St Mary's School, Gerrards Cross and went on to study Chemistry and Mathematics at Bedford College, London (part of the University of London), graduating with a BSc in 1912.

She went on to gain an MSc in 1922 and, in 1924, became the first woman to attain a DSc in Chemistry from the University of London.

== Career ==
After completing her BSc, she took a post teaching Botany at Colston's School, Bristol, before joining the Metallurgical Department of the National Physical Laboratory (United Kingdom) (NPL) in 1915 where she was one of the first two women to be appointed to Walter Rosenhain's scientific staff. Through her work at NPL, Gayler was elected member of the Institute of Metals in 1917 and member of the Iron and Steel Institute in 1918.

In 1934 Gayler married her NPL colleague Dr. John Leslie Haughton, although she continued to use her maiden name for professional purposes. Although the marriage bar remained in force in the UK civil-service until 1946, Gayler's boss applied for special dispensation and she became one of only five women within the civil service allowed to continue working once married. This was sufficiently significant to be reported in the press at the time.

== Research ==
Gayler's work at NPL alongside Hanson and Haughton established an understanding of the mechanisms of age hardening in the duralumin family of aluminium alloys. This work lay the foundations for the development of Y-alloy, an aluminium alloy containing nickel as well as the copper, magnesium and silicon found in typical duralumin alloys. The addition of nickel improved upon the strength and hardness of age-hardened duralumin at temperatures of 150-200degC, making it ideal for use as a piston material in combustion engines. A Y-alloy was also used as the skin of Concorde to enable it to withstand the temperatures caused by the movement of air over the aircraft when travelling at supersonic speeds.

In 1935, Gayler took-over NPL's work on dental amalgams, developing new metallographic techniques to study the diffusion and reactions within these alloys that govern their setting and hardening behaviour. She was made an honorary member of the British Dental Association in 1947 in recognition of this work.

In addition to her work on duraliumin and dental amalgams, Gayler also conducted noteworthy research on iron-manganese alloys and on the melting points of pure silicon and iron and on the behaviour of mild steel and duralloys for armour-piercing projectiles. In 1947, the Institute of Metals awarded its Platinum Medal jointly to her and her husband.

== Retirement ==
Gayler retired from NPL in 1947 at the age of 56 and used her retirement to devote more time to her interest in sculpture. She sculpted the head of renowned Professor William Hume-Rothery which stands in the library of the Department of Materials at Oxford University.

Marie Laura Violet Gayler died in Winchester in 1976.

== Awards and honours ==
- 1947 Institute of Metals Platinum Medal
- 1947 British Dental Association honorary membership
