= Peter Thompson (physicist) =

British CEO (born 1967)

Peter Thompson CBE FREng FInstP FRSC

14th CEO of NPL
- Incumbent
- Assumed office 2015
- Preceded by: Brian Bowsher

Personal details
- Born: July 1967 (age 59)
- Education: Cranfield University (1992); University of Salford (1989)
- Awards: Richard Glazebrook Medal and Prize (2022); Scientific Engineering CEO of the Year (2023)

Peter Anthony Thompson (born July 1967) is the Chief Executive Officer (CEO) of the National Physical Laboratory (NPL) since 2015. Before joining NPL, Thompson assumed different roles at the Defence Science and Technology Laboratory (Dstl).

In 2022, he was awarded the Institute of Physics's Richard Glazebrook Medal and Prize for "outstanding leadership of the National Physical Laboratory and the sustained impact of metrology on UK prosperity and quality of life". In 2023, he was awarded the Scientific Engineering CEO of the Year by CEO Monthly.

Thompson obtained a bachelor's degree in science from the University of Salford in 1989 and a doctor of philosophy from Cranfield University in 1992 in Molecular Electronics. He was elected a Fellow of the Royal Academy of Engineering (FREng) in 2018, Fellow of the Royal Society of Chemistry (FRSC), and Fellow of the Institute of Physics (FInstP). He is a visiting professor at the University of Surrey.

Thompson has been made a Commander of the Most Excellent Order of the British Empire (CBE) in the 2025 King's New Year Honours List.

Government offices
Preceded by Brian Bowsher	Managing Director of the National Physical Laboratory; 2015 –	Succeeded by
