= Marcia-Anne Dobres =

American archaeologist

Academic background
- Education: University of California, Berkeley

Academic work
- Institutions: University of Southern Maine

Marcia-Anne Dobres was an American archaeologist whose research focused primarily on the confluence of gender, agency, and technology. She was a professor at the University of Southern Maine. She died of thyroid cancer on May 14, 2021.

== Education ==
Dobres received her B.A. Summa cum Laude from New York University in 1986 and her M.A. from Binghamton University in 1988, both in Anthropology. In 1995, Dobres graduated with her Ph.D. in Anthropology from the University of California, Berkeley. Her Ph.D. advisor was Dr. Margaret W. Conkey.

== Research ==
=== Technology and social agency ===
Dobres' body of work examines the association between technology and social agency. Instead of focusing primarily on the materiality of technology, Dobres expounds the value of analyzing cultures through the lens of technological production. Dobres suggests that technology is inextricably linked to cultural practices, as the production of technology is shaped by social processes and is an avenue through which culture is expressed.

Dobres explores these concepts in her book Technology and Social Agency: Outlining a Practice Framework for Archaeology. This publication focuses on how the study of technology and social agency can be used to better understand how social constructs control and have controlled production of materials through the centuries. Much of her other work contains research around similar topics such as gender, prehistoric technology and art, and societal impacts on such things.

== Selected bibliography ==
- Technology and Social Agency: Outlining a Practice Framework for Archaeology, 2000.
- The Phenomenal Promise of Chaîne Opératoire: Mindfully Engaged Bodies and the Manufacture of Personhood in a Regional Perspective, 2010.
- Agency in Archaeology (editor), 2000.
- The Social Dynamics of Technology: Practice, Politics, and World Views, 1999.
