= List of UK government scientific research institutes =

This article contains a list of scientific research institutes in the United Kingdom that are owned by the government.

== Biotechnology and Biological Sciences Research Council ==
- Babraham Institute
- Pirbright Institute
- Institute of Food Research
- Institute of Grassland and Environmental Research
- John Innes Centre
- Earlham Institute
- Roslin Institute
- Rothamsted Research
- Silsoe Research Institute (ceased operations in 2006)

== Science and Technology Facilities Council ==
Formerly Particle Physics and Astronomy Research Council

- Chilbolton Observatory
- Daresbury Laboratory
- Rutherford Appleton Laboratory
  - HM Nautical Almanac Office
- Diamond Light Source (86% stake, with the other 14% owned by the Wellcome Trust)
- UK Astronomy Technology Centre

== Department for Environment, Food and Rural Affairs ==
- Animal and Plant Health Agency (APHA)
- Central Science Laboratory (defunct)
- Centre for Environment, Fisheries and Aquaculture Science (Cefas)
- Veterinary Laboratories Agency
- Veterinary Medicines Directorate (VMD)

== Department of Health ==
- Medicines and Healthcare products Regulatory Agency (MHRA)
- National Radiological Protection Board

== Department for Business, Innovation and Skills ==
- National Physical Laboratory
- National Nuclear Laboratory
- Meteorological Office

== Ministry of Defence ==
- Atomic Weapons Establishment
- Defence Science and Technology Laboratory

== Medical Research Council ==
- Cognition and Brain Sciences Unit
- Laboratory of Molecular Biology
- Clinical Sciences Centre
- Francis Crick Institute
- National Institute for Medical Research (now defunct)
- Sorby Research Institute (now defunct)

== Natural Environment Research Council ==
- British Antarctic Survey
- British Geological Survey
- Centre for Ecology and Hydrology
- National Oceanography Centre
- Plymouth Marine Laboratory
- National Centre for Atmospheric Science
