= Chaîne opératoire =

Term in anthropology

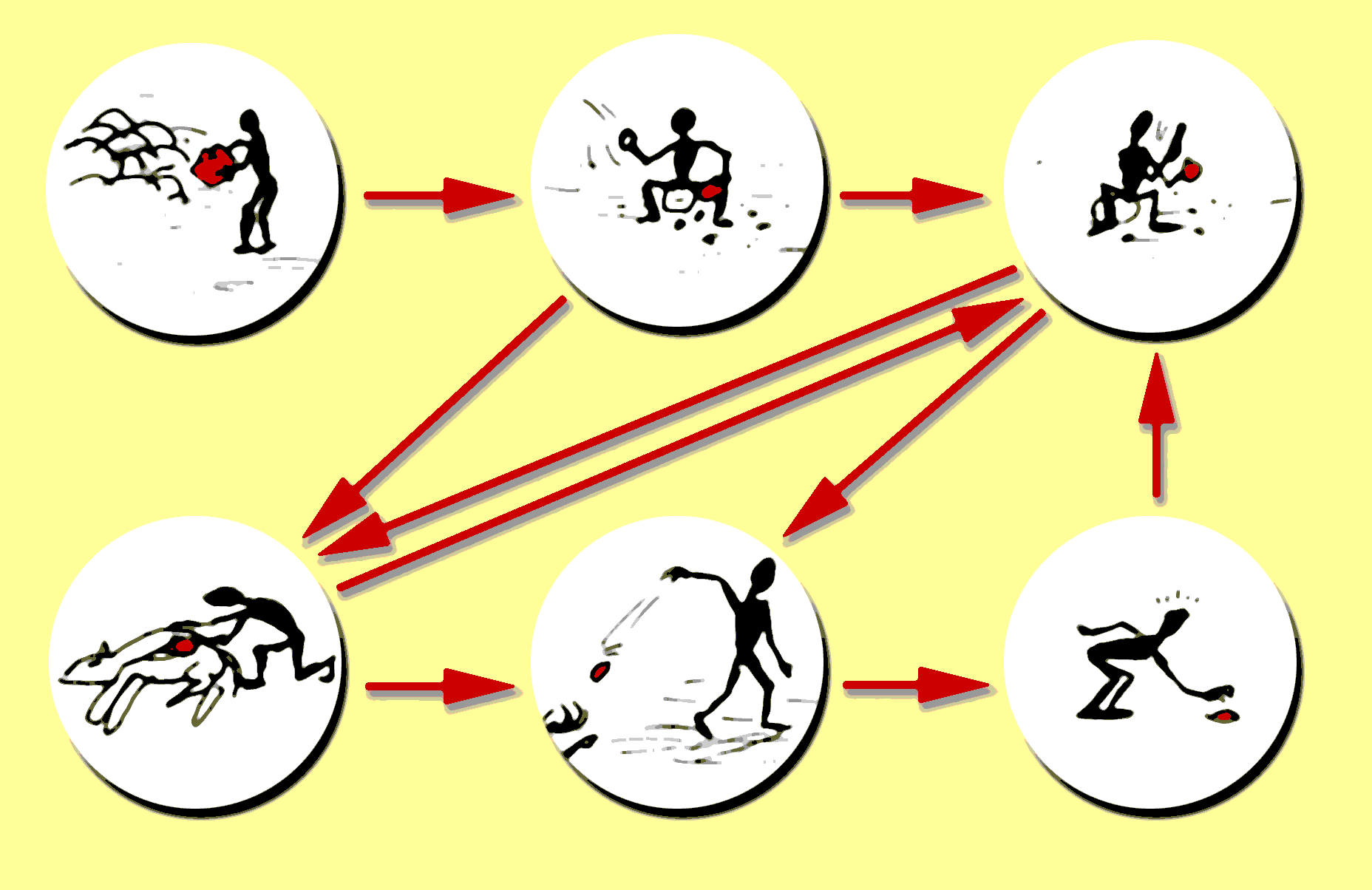
A stone tool's simplified chaîne opératoire. Despite its name, the chaîne need not be linear.

Chaîne opératoire (French: [ʃɛn‿ɔpeʁatwaʁ]; lit. 'operational chain' or 'operational sequence') is a term used throughout anthropological discourse, most commonly in archaeology and sociocultural anthropology. The term denotes a description of the stages of production of material culture—especially pottery and stone tools made through lithic reduction—from raw material acquisition to tool production to use to abandonment.

The chaîne opératoire was born out of archaeologists' interest in elevating lithic analysis beyond simple typology. Building an object's chaîne opératoire is an important methodological tool. In a chaîne opératoire approach, archaeologists create a full biography of technologies, attempting to understand their craftsmanship and use in different social groups. By understanding the processes and construction of tools, archaeologists can better determine the evolution of technology, model human behavior, and understand the development of ancient cultures. As archaeologists come to understand an object's chaîne opératoire, they better understand human choices and technical traditions.

The concept of technology as the science of human activities was first proposed by French archaeologist, André Leroi-Gourhan, and later by the historian of science André-Georges Haudricourt. Both were students of Marcel Mauss who had earlier recognised that societies could be understood through its techniques by virtue of the fact that operational sequences are steps organised according to an internal logic specific to a society.

Artifact analysis has undergone several changes throughout its history, shifting from an orientation as a natural science of prehistoric humans to a social and cultural anthropology of the production techniques of prehistoric societies. From this perspective, a chaîne opératoire can be understood as a social product, as it calls for an interdisciplinary approach to artifact analysis (the integration of associated disciplines: archaeology, sociocultural anthropology, biological anthropology, and anthropological linguistics), which offers a multidimensional view of a society, and demonstrates how a chaîne opératoire cannot operate independently of the society which produces it. Consequently, the study of the technique - or chaîne opératoire - enables one to better understand not only the society in which the technique originated, but also the social context, actions, and cognition that accompanied the production of an object.

== Criticism of chaîne opératoire ==
Critics of chaîne opératoire argue that it is subjective because it is based upon the analyst's personal experience and intuition. They further claim that it is not a replicable or quantifiable approach to data collection. A second objection is that chaîne opératoire claims to be able to identify the intentions and goals of prehistoric knappers, including the "desired endproducts" of knapping sequences. However, what archaeologists select from an assemblage as "end products" may not match what people in the past thought worthwhile to select for transport and subsequent use elsewhere in the landscape. A third major problem with the chaîne opératoire approach is that there is severe inconsistency in the application of definitions by lithic analysts. For example, since the publication of Éric Boëda's definition of six nondisassociable criteria for Discoidal debitage, numerous variants have been proposed, and many authors have argued for the presence of Levallois concept (that Eric defined from features of the Levallois technique) even when those six criteria were not met.
