= Isabel Hadfield =

British physical chemist

Isabel Hodgson Hadfield M.Sc.
- Born: 29 January 1893
- Died: 6 February 1965 (aged 72)
- Education: East London College
- Occupations: Microchemist, Physical chemist
- Employer: National Physical Laboratory (United Kingdom)

Isabel Hodgson Hadfield (29 January 1893 – 6 February 1965) was a British physical chemist and one of the first women to be employed as a scientific member of staff for the metallurgy department of the National Physical Laboratory (NPL).

== Early life ==
Isabel Hodgson Hadfield was born on 29 January 1893 to Annie (née Hodgson) and George William Hadfield in Welling, Kent, the youngest of three siblings.

== Education ==
Hadfield graduated from East London College in 1914, where her father was a schoolmaster. She earned an M.Sc. in 1923 as a result of her work with the metallurgy department of the National Physical Laboratory.

== Career ==
Hadfield joined the Birmingham Education Council in 1915, working as a chemistry mistress. In 1917, she joined the National Physical Laboratory as a junior assistant. She was one of the first two women in the scientific staff within the metallurgy department, alongside Marie Gayler. She initially worked alongside Mr Murdock for the India Office, with a focus on steel analysis.

Although Hadfield joined the NPL as a result of the demand for female scientists during World War I, she continued with the department after the War. She moved to work in research and testing on the chemical problems related to aeronautics with Dr Guy Barr, contributing to reports submitted to the Fabrics Research Co-ordinating Committee of DSIR. These reports focused on the effects of acid traces and light on the strength of cotton.

She presented a paper entitled Some Chemical Problems in the Cotton Industry at the International Conference of Women in Science, Industry and Commerce at the British Empire Exhibition on 16 July 1925, speaking alongside the American engineer Ethel H. Bailey and electrical engineer Margaret Partridge. This paper was later published in Vol II Part 4. of The Woman Engineer in September 1925.

Her work experimenting with very small specimens led to her selection in 1931 by Dr Cecil H. Desch to develop microchemical methods in the NPL. As a result of this work she became active in the British Microchemical Club and became known as an authority on microchemistry, developing new techniques and apparatus for use within the field. Her work in microchemistry led her to become a member of the British Standards Institution sub-committee contributing to the production of updates to B.S. 914:1940. Her work included experiments and examinations of porcelain apparatus, which were excluded from the existing standard.

She was a member of the Society for Analytical Chemistry, joining in 1944, and the National Union of Scientific Workers.

She retired from the NPL in March 1953, at which time she held the role of Principal Scientific Officer. She was particularly known within the NPL for her contributions to the welfare of female staff.

Isabel Hodgson Hadfield died in Alresford, Hampshire on 6 February 1965.
