= Indentation hardness =

Any measure of hardness based on indentation resistance

Indentation hardness tests are used in mechanical engineering to determine the hardness of a material to deformation. Several such tests exist, wherein the examined material is indented until an impression is formed; these tests can be performed on a macroscopic or microscopic scale.

When testing metals, indentation hardness correlates roughly linearly with tensile strength, but it is an imperfect correlation often limited to small ranges of strength and hardness for each indentation geometry. This relation permits economically important nondestructive testing of bulk metal deliveries with lightweight, even portable equipment, such as hand-held Rockwell hardness testers.

== Material hardness ==
Different techniques are used to quantify material characteristics at smaller scales. Measuring mechanical properties for materials, for instance, of thin films, cannot be done using conventional uniaxial tensile testing. As a result, techniques testing material "hardness" by indenting a material with a very small impression have been developed to attempt to estimate these properties.

Hardness measurements quantify the resistance of a material to plastic deformation. Indentation hardness tests compose the majority of processes used to determine material hardness, and can be divided into three classes: macro, micro and nanoindentation tests. Microindentation tests typically have forces less than 2 N (0.45 lb_{f}). Hardness, however, cannot be considered to be a fundamental material property. Classical hardness testing usually creates a number that can be used to provide a relative idea of material properties. As such, hardness can only offer a comparative idea of the material's resistance to plastic deformation since different hardness techniques have different scales.

The equation-based definition of hardness is the pressure applied over the contact area between the indenter and the material being tested. As a result, hardness values are typically reported in units of pressure, although this is only a "true" pressure if the indenter and surface interface are perfectly flat.

== Instrumented indentation ==
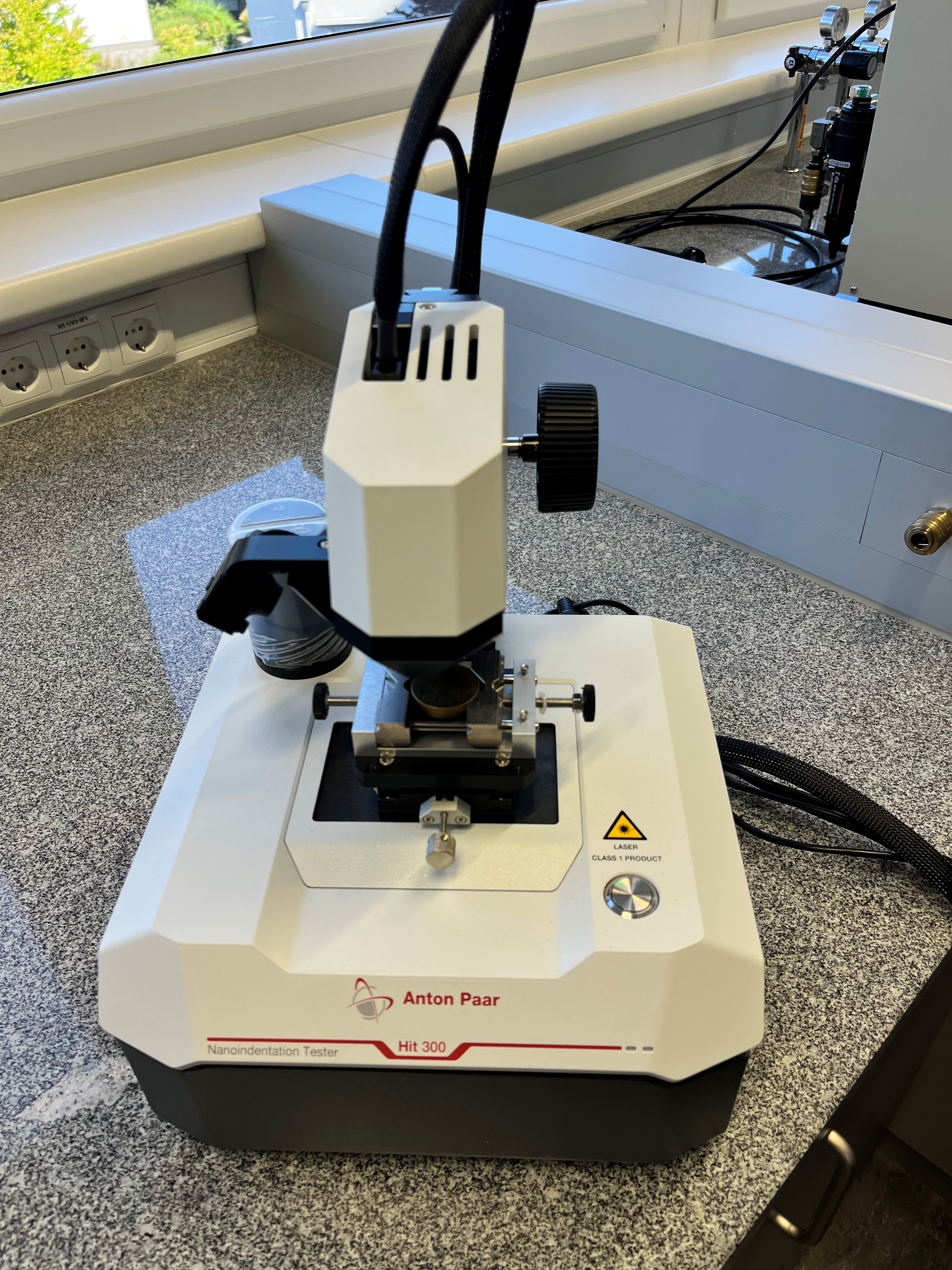
Instrumented Indentation Tester

Instrumented indentation basically indents a sharp tip into the surface of a material to obtain a force-displacement curve. The results provide a lot of information about the mechanical behavior of the material, including hardness, e.g., elastic moduli and plastic deformation. One key factor of the instrumented indentation test is that the tip needs to be controlled by force or displacement that can be measured simultaneously throughout the indentation cycle. Current technology can realize accurate force control in a wide range. Therefore, hardness can be characterized at many different length scales, from hard materials like ceramics to soft materials like polymers.

The earliest work was finished by Bulychev, Alekhin, Shorshorov in the 1970s, who determined that Young's modulus of a material can be determined from the slope of a force vs. displacement indentation curve as:

$$S={dP \over d\delta}=\frac{2}{\sqrt{\pi}}E_r\sqrt{A}$$

$S$: material stiffness, which is the slope of the curve

$A$: the tip-sample contact area

$E_r$: reduced modulus, defined as:

$$\frac{1}{E_r}=\frac{1-\nu_s^2}{E_s}+\frac{1-\nu_i^2}{E_i}$$

Where $E_s$ and $\nu_s$ are the Young's modulus and Poisson's ratio of the sample, an $E_i$ and $\nu_i$ are that of the indenter. Since typically, $E_i \gg E_s$, the second term can typically be ignored.

The most critical information, hardness, can be calculated by:

$$H=\frac{P_{max}}{A}$$

Commonly used indentation techniques, as well as detailed calculations of each different method, are discussed as follows.

== Macroindentation tests ==
The term "macroindentation" is applied to tests with a larger test load, such as 1 kgf or more. There are various macroindentation tests, including:

- Vickers hardness test (HV), which has one of the widest scales. Widely used to test the hardness of all kinds of metal materials (steel, nonferrous metals, tinsel, cemented carbide, sheet metal, etc.); surface layer / coating (Carburization, nitriding, decarburization layer, surface hardening layer, galvanized coating, etc.).
- Brinell hardness test (HB) BHN and HBW are widely used
- Knoop hardness test (HK), for measurement over small areas, is widely used to test glass or ceramic material.
- Janka hardness test, for wood
- Meyer hardness test
- Rockwell hardness test (HR), principally used in the USA. HRA, HRB and HRC scales are most widely used.
- Shore hardness test, for polymers, is widely used in the rubber industry.
- Barcol hardness test, for composite materials.

There is, in general, no simple relationship between the results of different hardness tests. Though there are practical conversion tables for hard steels, for example, some materials show qualitatively different behaviors under the various measurement methods. However, the Vickers and Brinell hardness scales correlate well over a wide range, as Brinell only produces overestimated values at high loads.

Indentation procedures can, however, be used to extract genuine stress-strain relationships. Certain criteria need to be met if reliable results are to be obtained. These include the need to deform a relatively large volume, and hence to use large loads. The methodologies involved are often grouped under the term Indentation plastometry, which is described in a separate article.

== Microindentation tests ==
The term "microhardness" has been widely employed in the literature to describe the hardness testing of materials with low applied loads. A more precise term is "microindentation hardness testing." In microindentation hardness testing, a diamond indenter of specific geometry is impressed into the surface of the test specimen using a known applied force (commonly called a "load" or "test load") of 1 to 1000 gf. Microindentation tests typically have forces of 2 N (roughly 200 gf) and produce indentations of about 50 μm. Due to their specificity, microhardness testing can be used to observe changes in hardness on the microscopic scale. Unfortunately, it is difficult to standardize microhardness measurements; it has been found that the microhardness of almost any material is higher than its macrohardness. Additionally, microhardness values vary with load and work-hardening effects of materials. The two most commonly used microhardness tests are tests that can also be applied with heavier loads as macroindentation tests:

- Vickers hardness test (HV)
- Knoop hardness test (HK)

In microindentation testing, the hardness number is based on measurements made of the indent formed in the surface of the test specimen. The hardness number is based on the applied force divided by the surface area of the indent itself, giving hardness units in kgf/mm^{2}. Microindentation hardness testing can be done using Vickers as well as Knoop indenters. For the Vickers test, both the diagonals are measured, and the average value is used to compute the Vickers pyramid number. In the Knoop test, only the longer diagonal is measured, and the Knoop hardness is calculated based on the projected area of the indent divided by the applied force, also giving test units in kgf/mm^{2}.

The Vickers microindentation test is carried out in a similar manner welling to the Vickers macroindentation tests, using the same pyramid. The Knoop test uses an elongated pyramid to indent material samples. This elongated pyramid creates a shallow impression, which is beneficial for measuring the hardness of brittle materials or thin components. Both the Knoop and Vickers indenters require polishing of the surface to achieve accurate results.

Scratch tests at low loads, such as the Bierbaum microcharacter test, performed with either 3 gf or 9 gf loads, preceded the development of microhardness testers using traditional indenters. In 1925, Smith and Sandland of the UK developed an indentation test that employed a square-based pyramidal indenter made from diamond. They chose the pyramidal shape with an angle of 136° between opposite faces in order to obtain hardness numbers that would be as close as possible to Brinell hardness numbers for the specimen. The Vickers test has the great advantage of using one hardness scale to test all materials. The first reference to the Vickers indenter with low loads was made in the annual report of the National Physical Laboratory in 1932. Lips and Sack describes the first Vickers tester using low loads in 1936.

There is some disagreement in the literature regarding the load range applicable to microhardness testing. ASTM Specification E384, for example, states that the load range for microhardness testing is 1 to 1000 gf. For loads of 1 kgf and below, the Vickers hardness (HV) is calculated with an equation, wherein load (L) is in grams force and the mean of two diagonals (d) is in millimeters:

$$HV=0.0018544\times\tfrac{L}{d^2}$$

For any given load, the hardness increases rapidly at low diagonal lengths, with the effect becoming more pronounced as the load decreases. Thus, at low loads, small measurement errors will produce large hardness deviations. Thus, one should always use the highest possible load in any test. Also, in the vertical portion of the curves, small measurement errors will produce large hardness deviations.

== Sources of error ==
The main sources of error with indentation tests are poor technique, poor calibration of the equipment, and the strain hardening effect of the process. However, it has been experimentally determined through "strainless hardness tests" that the effect is minimal with smaller indentations.

Surface finish of the part and the indenter do not have an effect on the hardness measurement, as long as the indentation is large compared to the surface roughness. This proves to be useful when measuring the hardness of practical surfaces. It is also helpful when leaving a shallow indentation, because a finely etched indenter leaves a much easier to read indentation than a smooth indenter.

The indentation that is left after the indenter and load are removed is known to "recover", or spring back slightly. This effect is properly known as shallowing. For spherical indenters, the indentation is known to stay symmetrical and spherical, but with a larger radius. For very hard materials, the radius can be three times as large as the indenter's radius. This effect is attributed to the release of elastic stresses. Because of this effect, the diameter and depth of the indentation do contain errors. The error from the change in diameter is known to be only a few percent, with the error for the depth being greater.

Another effect the load has on the indentation is the piling-up or sinking-in of the surrounding material. If the metal is work hardened, it tends to pile up and form a "crater". If the metal is annealed, it will sink in around the indentation. Both of these effects add to the error of the hardness measurement.

== Relation to yield stress ==
When hardness, $H$, is defined as the mean contact pressure (load/ projected contact area), the yield stress, $\sigma_y$, of many materials is proportional to the hardness by a constant known as the constrain factor, C.

$$H=C\sigma_y$$

where:

$$C \approx \begin{cases} 3 & \text{large }  E/\sigma_y \text{ (ex. metals)}\\
1.5 & \text{small } E/\sigma_y \text{ (ex. glasses)}\end{cases}$$

The hardness differs from the uniaxial compressive yield stress of the material because different compressive failure modes apply. A uniaxial test only constrains the material in one dimension, which allows the material to fail as a result of shear. Indentation hardness, on the other hand, is constrained in three dimensions, which prevents shear from dominating the failure.

== See also ==
- Leeb rebound hardness test
- Meyer's law
