= Mohs scale =

Classification framework for scratch resistance

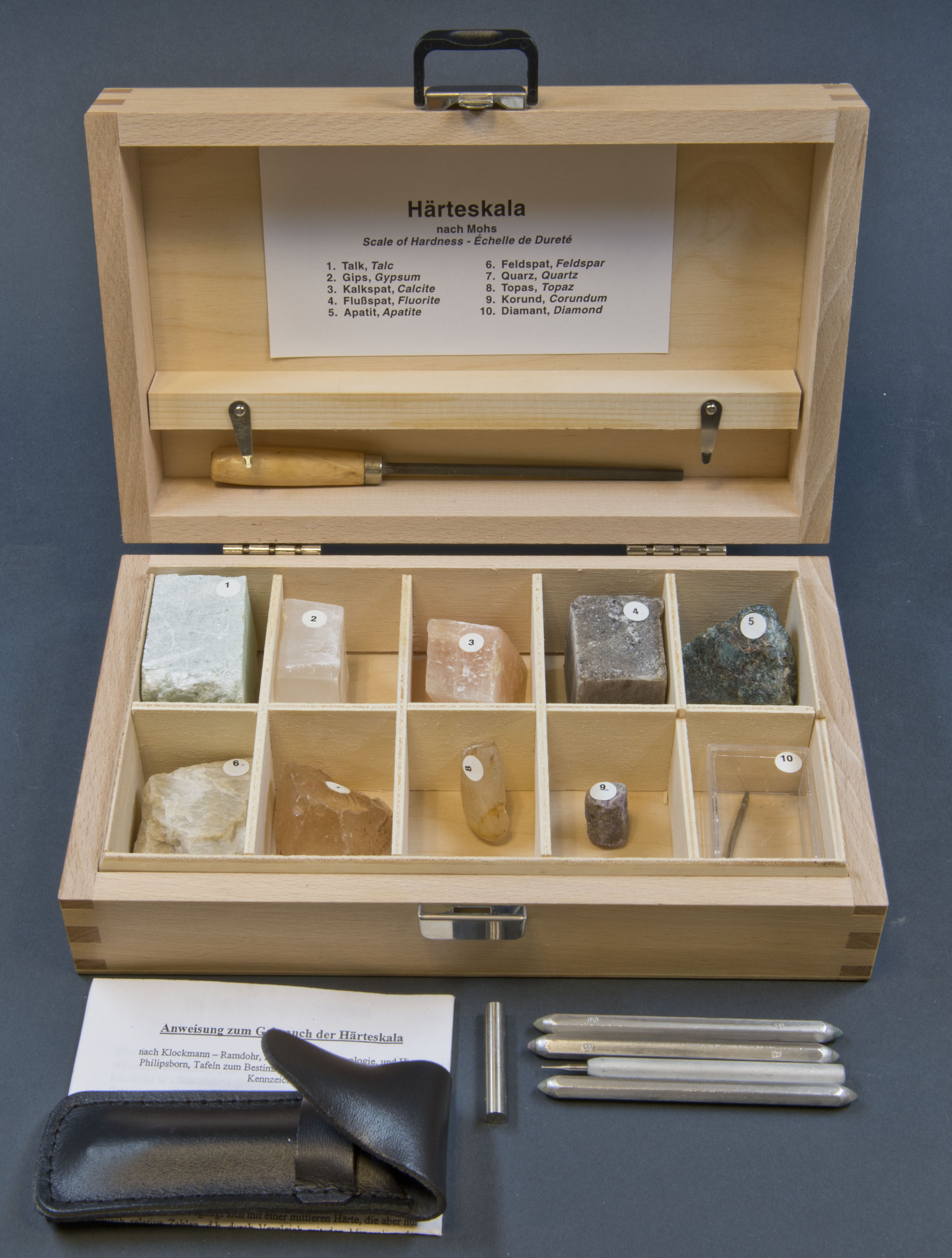
Mohs hardness kit, containing one specimen of each mineral on the ten-point hardness scale

The Mohs scale (/moʊz/ MOHZ) of mineral hardness is a qualitative ordinal scale, from 1 to 10, characterizing scratch resistance of minerals through the ability of harder material to scratch softer material.

The scale was introduced in 1812 by the German geologist and mineralogist Friedrich Mohs, in his book Versuch einer Elementar-Methode zur naturhistorischen Bestimmung und Erkennung der Fossilien (transl. Attempt at an Elementary Method for the Natural-Historical Determination and Recognition of Fossils); (Note: In demselben Jahre (1812) wurde MOHS als Professor am Joanneum angestellt und veröffentlichte den ersten Teil seines Werkes "Versuch einer Elementarmethode zur naturhistorischen Erkennung und Bestimmung der Fossilien" [sic], in welcher die bekannte Härteskala aufgestellt wurde. [In the same year (1812) MOHS was employed as a professor at the Joanneum and published the first part of his work Attempt at an elementary method for the natural-historical recognition and determination of fossils [sic], in which the well-known hardness scale was set up.]) it is one of several definitions of hardness in materials science, some of which are more quantitative.

The method of comparing hardness by observing which minerals can scratch others is of great antiquity, having been mentioned by Theophrastus in his treatise On Stones, c. 300 BC, followed by Pliny the Elder in his Naturalis Historia, c. AD 77. The Mohs scale is useful for identification of minerals in the field, but is not an accurate predictor of how well materials endure in an industrial setting.

== Reference minerals ==
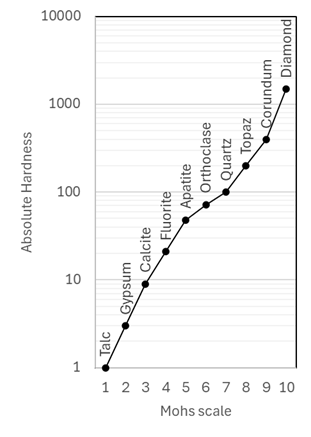
Mohs scale along the horizontal axis matched with the absolute hardness of each of the Mohs reference minerals along the vertical. Notice that the vertical scale is logarithmic.

The Mohs scale of mineral hardness is based on the ability of one natural sample of mineral to visibly scratch another mineral. Minerals are chemically pure solids found in nature. Rocks are mixtures of one or more minerals.

Diamond was the hardest known naturally occurring mineral when the scale was designed and defines the top of the scale, arbitrarily set at 10. The hardness of a material is measured against the scale by finding the hardest material that the given material can scratch, or the softest material that can scratch the given material. For example, if some material is scratched by apatite but not by fluorite, its hardness on the Mohs scale would be between 4 and 5.

Technically, "scratching" a material for the purposes of the Mohs scale means creating non-elastic dislocations visible to the naked eye. Frequently, materials that are lower on the Mohs scale can create microscopic, non-elastic dislocations on materials that have a higher Mohs number. While these microscopic dislocations are permanent and sometimes detrimental to the harder material's structural integrity, they are not considered "scratches" for the determination of a Mohs scale number.

Each of the ten hardness values in the Mohs scale is represented by a reference mineral, most of which are widespread in rocks.

The Mohs scale is an ordinal scale. For example, corundum (9) is twice as hard as topaz (8), but diamond (10) is about four times as hard as corundum, for absolute hardness. The table below shows the comparison with the absolute hardness measured by a sclerometer, with images of the reference minerals in the rightmost column.

Mohs hardness	Reference mineral	Chemical formula	Absolute hardness	Example image
1	Talc	Mg_{3}Si_{4}O_{10}(OH)_{2}	1	
2	Gypsum	CaSO_{4}·2H_{2}O	2	
3	Calcite	CaCO_{3}	14	
4	Fluorite	CaF_{2}	21	
5	Apatite	Ca_{5}(PO_{4})_{3}(OH,Cl,F)	48	
6	Orthoclase feldspar	KAlSi_{3}O_{8}	72	
7	Quartz	SiO_{2}	100	
8	Topaz	Al_{2}SiO_{4}(OH,F)_{2}	200	
9	Corundum	Al_{2}O_{3}	400	
10	Diamond	C	1500	

== Examples ==
Below is a table of more materials by Mohs scale. Some of them have a hardness between two of the Mohs scale reference minerals. Some solid substances that are not minerals have been assigned a hardness on the Mohs scale. Hardness may be difficult to determine, or may be misleading or meaningless, if a material is a mixture of multiple substances. For example, granite has been assigned by some sources a Mohs hardness between 6 and 7, but it is a rock made of several minerals, each with its own Mohs hardness. Topaz-rich granite is mainly composed of topaz (Mohs 8), quartz (Mohs 7), orthoclase (Mohs 6), plagioclase (Mohs 6–6.5), and mica (Mohs 2–4).

Hardness	Substance
0.2–0.4	Potassium
0.5–0.6	Lithium
1	Talc
1.5	Lead
2	Hardwood
2–2.5	Plastic
2.5	Zinc
2.5–3	Copper
3	Brass
3.5	Adamite
3.5–4	Sphalerite
4	Iron
4–4.5	Ordinary steel
4.5	Colemanite
5	Apatite
5–5.5	Goethite
5.5	Glass
5.5–6	Opal
6	Rhodium
6–6.5	Rutile
6.5	Silicon
6.5–7	Jadeite
7	Porcelain
7–7.5	Garnet
7.5	Tungsten
7.5–8	Emerald
8	Topaz
8.5	Chromium
9	Sapphire
9–9.5	Moissanite
9.5–near 10	Boron
10	Diamond

== Use ==
Despite its lack of precision, the Mohs scale is relevant for field geologists, who use it to roughly identify minerals using scratch kits. The Mohs scale hardness of minerals can be commonly found in reference sheets.

Mohs hardness is useful in milling. It allows the assessment of which type of mill and grinding medium will best reduce a given product whose hardness is known.

Electronic manufacturers use the scale for testing the resilience of flat panel display components (such as cover glass for LCDs or encapsulation for OLEDs), as well as to evaluate the hardness of touch screens in consumer electronics.

== Comparison with Vickers scale ==
Comparison between Mohs hardness and Vickers hardness:

Mineral name	Hardness (Mohs)	Hardness (Vickers) (kg/mm^{2})
Tin	1.5	VHN_{10} = 7–9
Bismuth	2–2.5	VHN_{100} = 16–18
Gold	2.5	VHN_{10} = 30–34
Silver	2.5	VHN_{100} = 61–65
Chalcocite	2.5–3	VHN_{100} = 84–87
Copper	2.5–3	VHN_{100} = 77–99
Galena	2.5	VHN_{100} = 79–104
Sphalerite	3.5–4	VHN_{100} = 208–224
Heazlewoodite	4	VHN_{100} = 230–254
Goethite	5–5.5	VHN_{100} = 667
Chromite	5.5	VHN_{100} = 1,278–1,456
Anatase	5.5–6	VHN_{100} = 616–698
Rutile	6–6.5	VHN_{100} = 894–974
Pyrite	6–6.5	VHN_{100} = 1,505–1,520
Bowieite	7	VHN_{100} = 858–1,288
Euclase	7.5	VHN_{100} = 1,310
Chromium	8.5	VHN_{100} = 1,875–2,000

== See also ==
- Brinell scale
- Geological Strength Index
- Hardnesses of the elements (data page)
- Knoop hardness test
- Meyer hardness test
- Pencil hardness
- Rockwell scale
- Rosiwal scale
- Scratch hardness
- Superhard material
