= Ceramography =

Preparation and study of ceramics with optical instruments

Ceramography is the art and science of preparation, examination and evaluation of ceramic microstructures. Ceramography can be thought of as the metallography of ceramics. The microstructure is the structure level of approximately 0.1 to 100 μm, between the minimum wavelength of visible light and the resolution limit of the naked eye. The microstructure includes most grains, secondary phases, grain boundaries, pores, micro-cracks and hardness microindentations. Most bulk mechanical, optical, thermal, electrical and magnetic properties are significantly affected by the microstructure. The fabrication method and process conditions are generally indicated by the microstructure. The root cause of many ceramic failures is evident in the microstructure. Ceramography is part of the broader field of materialography, which includes all the microscopic techniques of material analysis, such as metallography, petrography and plastography. Ceramography is usually reserved for high-performance ceramics for industrial applications, such as 85–99.9% alumina (Al_{2}O_{3}) in Fig. 1, zirconia (ZrO_{2}), silicon carbide (SiC), silicon nitride (Si_{3}N_{4}), and ceramic-matrix composites. It is seldom used on whiteware ceramics such as sanitaryware, wall tiles and dishware.

Ceramographic microstructures

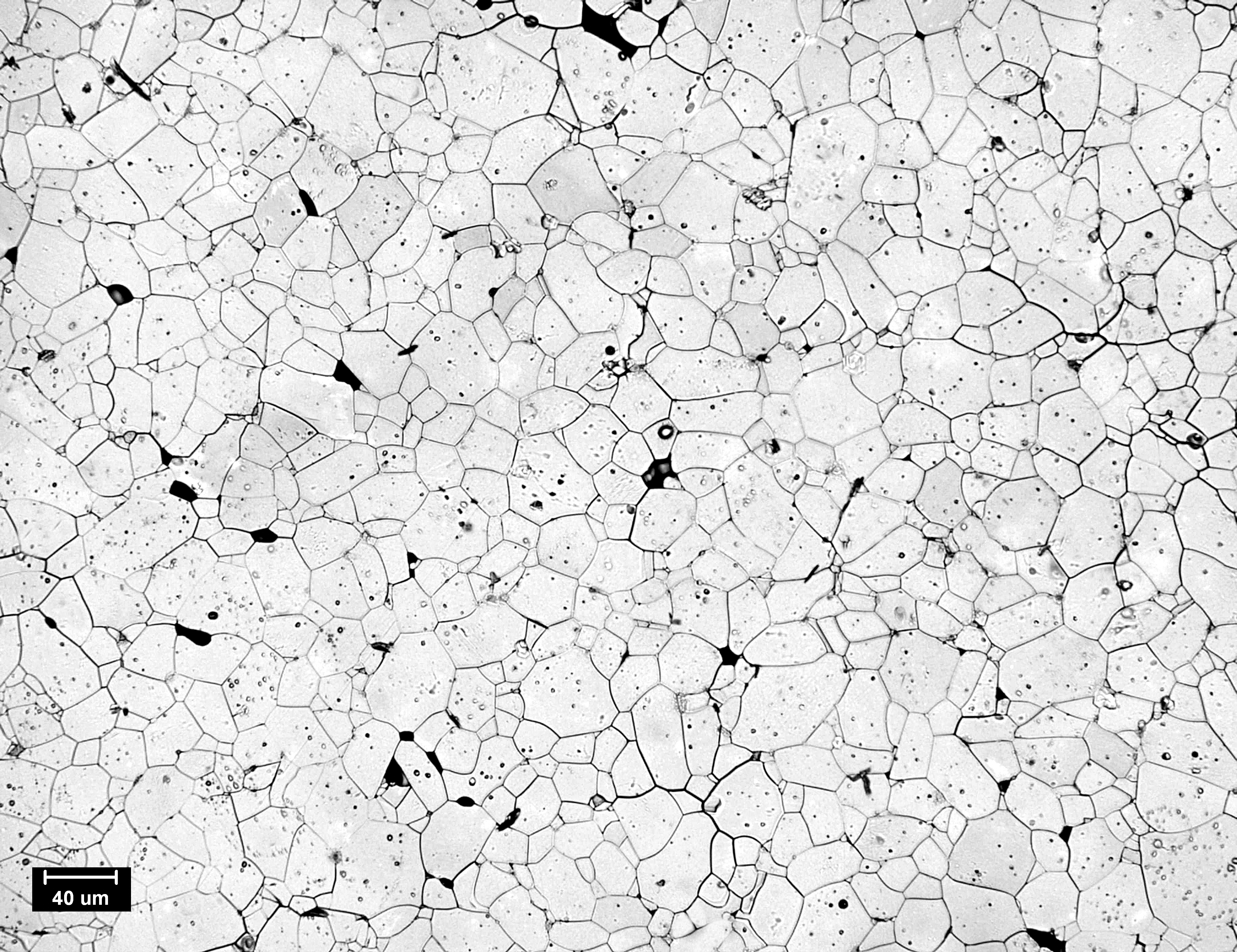
Fig. 1: Thermally etched 99.9% alumina

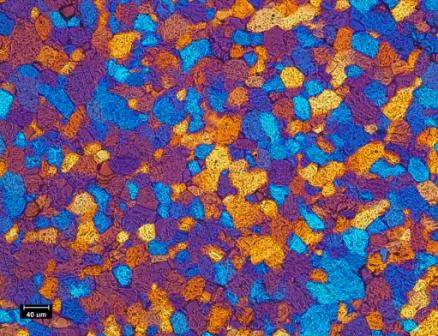
Fig. 2: Thin section of 99.9% alumina

== History ==
Ceramography evolved along with other branches of materialography and ceramic engineering. Alois de Widmanstätten of Austria etched a meteorite in 1808 to reveal proeutectoid ferrite bands that grew on prior austenite grain boundaries. Geologist Henry Clifton Sorby, the "father of metallography", applied petrographic techniques to the steel industry in the 1860s in Sheffield, England. French geologist Auguste Michel-Lévy devised a chart that correlated the optical properties of minerals to their transmitted color and thickness in the 1880s. Swedish metallurgist J.A. Brinell invented the first quantitative hardness scale in 1900. Smith and Sandland developed the first microindentation hardness test at Vickers Ltd. in London in 1922. Swiss-born microscopist A.I. Buehler started the first metallographic equipment manufacturer near Chicago in 1936. Frederick Knoop and colleagues at the National Bureau of Standards developed a less-penetrating (than Vickers) microindentation test in 1939. Struers A/S of Copenhagen introduced the electrolytic polisher to metallography in 1943. George Kehl of Columbia University wrote a book that was considered the bible of materialography until the 1980s. Kehl co-founded a group within the Atomic Energy Commission that became the International Metallographic Society in 1967.

== Preparation of ceramographic specimens ==
The preparation of ceramic specimens for microstructural analysis consists of five broad steps: sawing, embedding, grinding, polishing and etching. The tools and consumables for ceramographic preparation are available worldwide from metallography equipment vendors and laboratory supply companies.

=== Sawing ===
Most ceramics are extremely hard and must be wet-sawed with a circular blade embedded with diamond particles. A metallography or lapidary saw equipped with a low-density diamond blade is usually suitable. The blade must be cooled by a continuous liquid spray.

=== Embedding ===
To facilitate further preparation, the sawed specimen is usually embedded (or mounted or encapsulated) in a plastic disc, 25, 32 or 38 mm in diameter. A thermosetting solid resin, activated by heat and compression, e.g. mineral-filled epoxy, is best for most applications. A castable (liquid) resin such as unfilled epoxy, acrylic or polyester may be used for porous refractory ceramics or microelectronic devices. The castable resins are also available with fluorescent dyes that aid in fluorescence microscopy. The left and right specimens in Fig. 3 were embedded in mineral-filled epoxy. The center refractory in Fig. 3 was embedded in castable, transparent acrylic.

=== Grinding ===
Grinding is abrasion of the surface of interest by abrasive particles, usually diamond, that are bonded to paper or a metal disc. Grinding erases saw marks, coarsely smooths the surface, and removes stock to a desired depth. A typical grinding sequence for ceramics is one minute on a 240-grit metal-bonded diamond wheel rotating at 240 rpm and lubricated by flowing water, followed by a similar treatment on a 400-grit wheel. The specimen is washed in an ultrasonic bath after each step.

=== Polishing ===
Polishing is abrasion by free abrasives that are suspended in a lubricant and can roll or slide between the specimen and paper. Polishing erases grinding marks and smooths the specimen to a mirror-like finish. Polishing on a bare metallic platen is called lapping. A typical polishing sequence for ceramics is 5–10 minutes each on 15-, 6- and 1-μm diamond paste or slurry on napless paper rotating at 240 rpm. The specimen is again washed in an ultrasonic bath after each step. The three sets of specimens in Fig. 3 have been sawed, embedded, ground and polished.

=== Etching ===
Etching reveals and delineates grain boundaries and other microstructural features that are not apparent on the as-polished surface. The two most common types of etching in ceramography are selective chemical corrosion, and a thermal treatment that causes relief. As an example, alumina can be chemically etched by immersion in boiling concentrated phosphoric acid for 30–60 s, or thermally etched in a furnace for 20–40 min at 1,500 °C (2,730 °F) in air. The plastic encapsulation must be removed before thermal etching. The alumina in Fig. 1 was thermally etched.

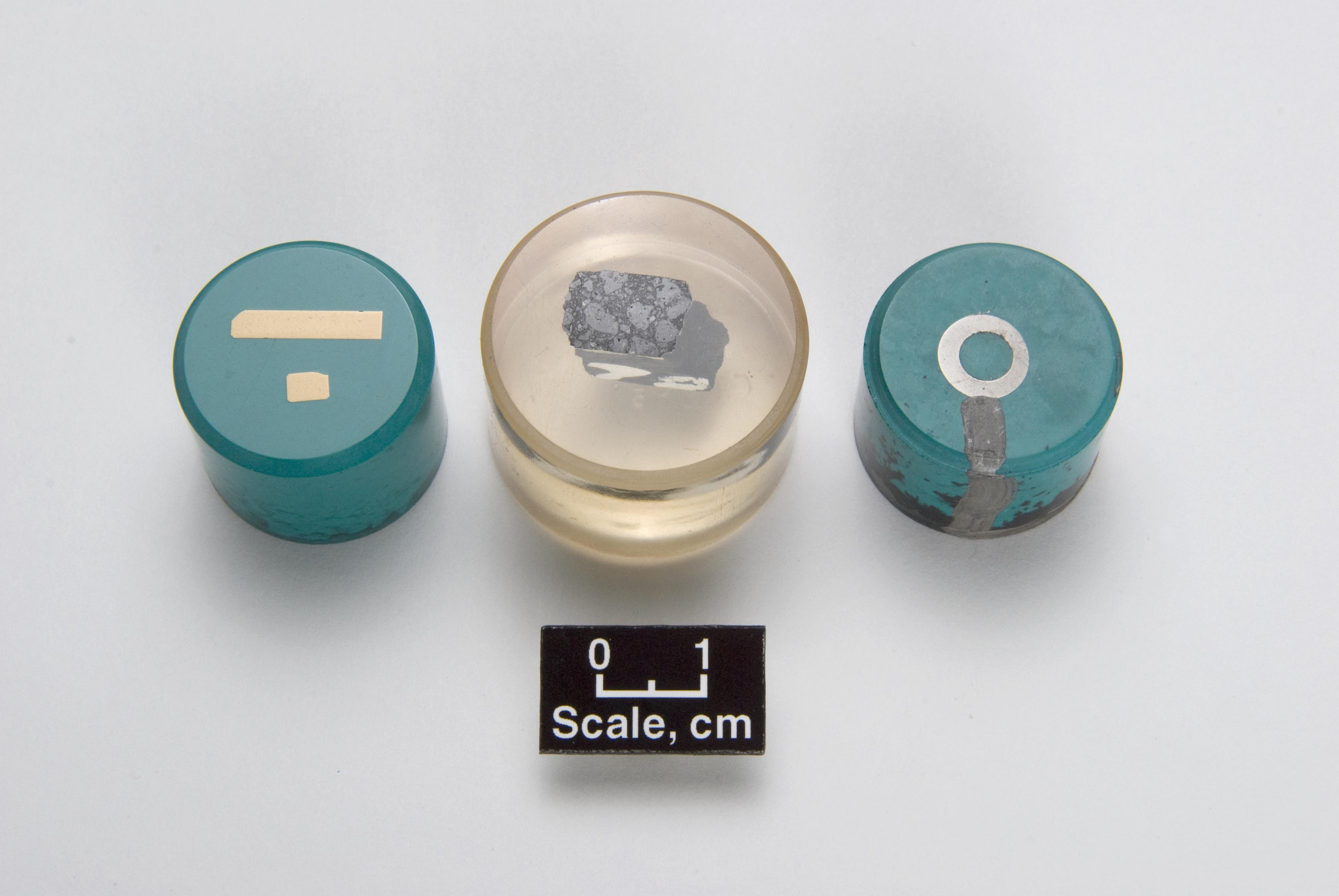
Embedded, polished ceramographic sections.

Alternatively, non-cubic ceramics can be prepared as thin sections, also known as petrography, for examination by polarized transmitted light microscopy. In this technique, the specimen is sawed to ~1 mm thick, glued to a microscope slide, and ground or sawed (e.g., by microtome) to a thickness (x) approaching 30 μm. A cover slip is glued onto the exposed surface. The adhesives, such as epoxy or Canada balsam resin, must have approximately the same refractive index (η ≈ 1.54) as glass. Most ceramics have a very small absorption coefficient (α ≈ 0.5 cm^{−1} for alumina in Fig. 2) in the Beer–Lambert law below, and can be viewed in transmitted light. Cubic ceramics, e.g. yttria-stabilized zirconia and spinel, have the same refractive index in all crystallographic directions and appear, therefore, black when the microscope's polarizer is 90° out of phase with its analyzer.

$I_t = I_0e^{-\alpha x}$ (Beer–Lambert eqn)

Ceramographic specimens are electrical insulators in most cases, and must be coated with a conductive ~10-nm layer of metal or carbon for electron microscopy, after polishing and etching. Gold or Au-Pd alloy from a sputter coater or evaporative coater also improves the reflection of visible light from the polished surface under a microscope, by the Fresnel formula below. Bare alumina (η ≈ 1.77, k ≈ 10^{−6}) has a negligible extinction coefficient and reflects only 8% of the incident light from the microscope, as in Fig. 1. Gold-coated (η ≈ 0.82, k ≈ 1.59 @ λ = 500 nm) alumina reflects 44% in air, 39% in immersion oil.

$R = \frac{I_r}{I_i} = \frac{(\eta_1 - \eta_2)^2 + k^2}{(\eta_1 + \eta_2)^2 + k^2}$ (Fresnel eqn)..

== Ceramographic analysis ==
Ceramic microstructures are most often analyzed by reflected visible-light microscopy in brightfield. Darkfield is used in limited circumstances, e.g., to reveal cracks. Polarized transmitted light is used with thin sections, where the contrast between grains comes from birefringence. Very fine microstructures may require the higher magnification and resolution of a scanning electron microscope (SEM) or confocal laser scanning microscope (CLSM). The cathodoluminescence microscope (CLM) is useful for distinguishing phases of refractories. The transmission electron microscope (TEM) and scanning acoustic microscope (SAM) have specialty applications in ceramography.

Ceramography is often done qualitatively, for comparison of the microstructure of a component to a standard for quality control or failure analysis purposes. Three common quantitative analyses of microstructures are grain size, second-phase content and porosity. Microstructures are measured by the principles of stereology, in which three-dimensional objects are evaluated in 2-D by projections or cross-sections. Microstructures exhibiting heterogeneous grain sizes, with certain grains growing very large, occur in diverse ceramic systems and this phenomenon is known as abnormal grain growth or AGG. The occurrence of AGG has consequences, positive or negative, on mechanical and chemical properties of ceramics and its identification is often the goal of ceramographic analysis.

Grain size can be measured by the line-fraction or area-fraction methods of ASTM E112. In the line-fraction methods, a statistical grain size is calculated from the number of grains or grain boundaries intersecting a line of known length or circle of known circumference. In the area-fraction method, the grain size is calculated from the number of grains inside a known area. In each case, the measurement is affected by secondary phases, porosity, preferred orientation, exponential distribution of sizes, and non-equiaxed grains. Image analysis can measure the shape factors of individual grains by ASTM E1382.

Second-phase content and porosity are measured the same way in a microstructure, such as ASTM E562. Procedure E562 is a point-fraction method based on the stereological principle of point fraction = volume fraction, i.e., P_{p} = V_{v}. Second-phase content in ceramics, such as carbide whiskers in an oxide matrix, is usually expressed as a mass fraction. Volume fractions can be converted to mass fractions if the density of each phase is known. Image analysis can measure porosity, pore-size distribution and volume fractions of secondary phases by ASTM E1245. Porosity measurements do not require etching. Multi-phase microstructures do not require etching if the contrast between phases is adequate, as is usually the case.

Grain size, porosity and second-phase content have all been correlated with ceramic properties such as mechanical strength σ by the Hall–Petch equation. Hardness, toughness, dielectric constant and many other properties are microstructure-dependent.

== Microindentation hardness and toughness ==
Knoop indention (P=1kg) in 99.5% alumina

Toughness indention (P=10kg) in 96% alumina

The hardness of a material can be measured in many ways. The Knoop hardness test, a method of microindentation hardness, is the most reproducible for dense ceramics. The Vickers hardness test and superficial Rockwell scales (e.g., 45N) can also be used, but tend to cause more surface damage than Knoop. The Brinell test is suitable for ductile metals, but not ceramics. In the Knoop test, a diamond indenter in the shape of an elongated pyramid is forced into a polished (but not etched) surface under a predetermined load, typically 500 or 1000 g. The load is held for some amount of time, say 10 s, and the indenter is retracted. The indention long diagonal (d, μm, in Fig. 4) is measured under a microscope, and the Knoop hardness (HK) is calculated from the load (P, g) and the square of the diagonal length in the equations below. The constants account for the projected area of the indenter and unit conversion factors. Most oxide ceramics have a Knoop hardness in the range of 1000–1500 kg_{f}/mm^{2} (10 – 15 GPa), and many carbides are over 2000 (20 GPa). The method is specified in ASTM C849, C1326 & E384. Microindentation hardness is also called microindentation hardness or simply microhardness. The hardness of very small particles and thin films of ceramics, on the order of 100 nm, can be measured by nanoindentation methods that use a Berkovich indenter.

$HK = 14229 \frac{P}{d^2}$ (kg_{f}/mm^{2}) and $HK = 139.54 \frac{P}{d^2}$ (GPa)

The toughness of ceramics can be determined from a Vickers test under a load of 10 – 20 kg. Toughness is the ability of a material to resist crack propagation. Several calculations have been formulated from the load (P), elastic modulus (E), microindentation hardness (H), crack length (c in Fig. 5) and flexural strength (σ). Modulus of rupture (MOR) bars with a rectangular cross-section are indented in three places on a polished surface. The bars are loaded in 4-point bending with the polished, indented surface in tension, until fracture. The fracture normally originates at one of the indentions. The crack lengths are measured under a microscope. The toughness of most ceramics is 2–4 MPa√m, but toughened zirconia is as much as 13, and cemented carbides are often over 20. The toughness-by-indention methods have been discredited recently and are being replaced by more rigorous methods that measure crack growth in a notched beam in bending.

$K_{icl} = 0.016 \sqrt{\frac{E}{H}}\frac{P}{(c_0)^{1.5}}$ initial crack length
$K_{isb} = 0.59 \left(\frac{E}{H}\right)^{1/8}[\sigma (P^{1/3})]^{3/4}$ indention strength in bending

== Further reading and external links ==
- Expert Guide: Materialography/Metallography, QATM Academy, ATM Qness GmbH, 2022.
- Metallographic Preparation of Ceramic and Cermet Materials, Leco Met-Tips No. 19, 2008.
- Sample Preparation of Ceramic Material, Buehler Ltd., 1990.
- Structure, Volume 33, Struers A/S, 1998, p 3–20.
- Struers Metalog Guide
- S. Binkowski, R. Paul & M. Woydt, "Comparing Preparation Techniques Using Microstructural Images of Ceramic Materials," Structure, Vol 39, 2002, p 8–19.
- R.E. Chinn, Ceramography, ASM International and the American Ceramic Society, 2002, ISBN 0-87170-770-5.
- D.J. Clinton, A Guide to Polishing and Etching of Technical and Engineering Ceramics, The Institute of Ceramics, 1987.
- Digital Library of Ceramic Microstructures, University of Dayton, 2003.
- G. Elssner, H. Hoven, G. Kiessler & P. Wellner, translated by R. Wert, Ceramics and Ceramic Composites: Materialographic Preparation, Elsevier Science Inc., 1999, ISBN 978-0-444-10030-6.
- R.M. Fulrath & J.A. Pask, ed., Ceramic Microstructures: Their Analysis, Significance, and Production, Robert E. Krieger Publishing Co., 1968, ISBN 0-88275-262-6.
- K. Geels in collaboration with D.B. Fowler, W-U Kopp & M. Rückert, Metallographic and Materialographic Specimen Preparation, Light Microscopy, Image Analysis and Hardness Testing, ASTM International, 2007, ISBN 978-0-8031-4265-7.
- H. Insley & V.D. Fréchette, Microscopy of Ceramics and Cements, Academic Press Inc., 1955.
- W.E. Lee and W.M. Rainforth, Ceramic Microstructures: Property Control by Processing, Chapman & Hall, 1994.
- I.J. McColm, Ceramic Hardness, Plenum Press, 2000, ISBN 0-306-43287-0.
- Micrograph Center, ASM International, 2005.
- H. Mörtel, "Microstructural Analysis," Engineered Materials Handbook, Volume 4: Ceramics and Glasses, ASM International, 1991, p 570–579, ISBN 0-87170-282-7.
- G. Petzow, Metallographic Etching, 2nd Edition, ASM International, 1999, ISBN 978-0-87170-633-1.
- G.D. Quinn, "Indentation Hardness Testing of Ceramics," ASM Handbook, Volume 8: Mechanical Testing and Evaluation, ASM International, 2000, p 244–251, ISBN 0-87170-389-0.
- A.T. Santhanam, "Metallography of Cemented Carbides," ASM Handbook Volume 9: Metallography and Microstructures, ASM International, 2004, p 1057–1066, ISBN 0-87170-706-3.
- U. Täffner, V. Carle & U. Schäfer, "Preparation and Microstructural Analysis of High-Performance Ceramics," ASM Handbook Volume 9: Metallography and Microstructures, ASM International, 2004, p 1057–1066, ISBN 0-87170-706-3.
- D.C. Zipperian, Metallographic Handbook, PACE Technologies, 2011.
