= Petrography =

Branch of petrology focusing on detailed descriptions of rocks

Petrography is a branch of petrology that focuses on detailed descriptions of rocks. Someone who studies petrography is called a petrographer. The mineral content and the textural relationships within the rock are described in detail. The classification of rocks is based on the information acquired during the petrographic analysis. Petrographic descriptions start with the field notes at the outcrop and include macroscopic description of hand-sized specimens. The most important petrographer's tool is the petrographic microscope. The detailed analysis of minerals by optical mineralogy in thin section and the micro-texture and structure are critical to understanding the origin of the rock.

Electron microprobe or atom probe tomography analysis of individual grains as well as whole rock chemical analysis by atomic absorption, X-ray fluorescence, and laser-induced breakdown spectroscopy are used in a modern petrographic lab. Individual mineral grains from a rock sample may also be analyzed by X-ray diffraction when optical means are insufficient. Analysis of microscopic fluid inclusions within mineral grains with a heating stage on a petrographic microscope provides clues to the temperature and pressure conditions existent during the mineral formation.

== History ==
Petrography as a science began in 1828 when Scottish physicist William Nicol invented the technique for producing polarized light by cutting a crystal of Iceland spar, a variety of calcite, into a special prism which became known as the Nicol prism. The addition of two such prisms to the ordinary microscope converted the instrument into a polarizing, or petrographic microscope. Using transmitted light and Nicol prisms, it was possible to determine the internal crystallographic character of very tiny mineral grains, greatly advancing the knowledge of a rock's constituents.

During the 1840s, a development by Henry C. Sorby and others firmly laid the foundation of petrography. This was a technique to study very thin slices of rock. A slice of rock was affixed to a microscope slide and then ground so thin that light could be transmitted through mineral grains that otherwise appeared opaque. The position of adjoining grains was not disturbed, thus permitting analysis of rock texture. Thin section petrography became the standard method of rock study. Since textural details contribute greatly to knowledge of the sequence of crystallization of the various mineral constituents in a rock, petrography progressed into petrogenesis and ultimately into petrology.

Petrography principally advanced in Germany in the latter 19th century.

== Methods of investigation ==
=== Macroscopic characters ===
The macroscopic characters of rocks, those visible in hand-specimens without the aid of the microscope, are very varied and difficult to describe accurately and fully. The geologist in the field depends principally on them and on a few rough chemical and physical tests; and to the practical engineer, architect and quarry-master they are all-important. Although frequently insufficient in themselves to determine the true nature of a rock, they usually serve for a preliminary classification, and often give all the information needed.

With a small bottle of acid to test for carbonate of lime, a knife to ascertain the hardness of rocks and minerals, and a pocket lens to magnify their structure, the field geologist is rarely at a loss to what group a rock belongs. The fine grained species are often indeterminable in this way, and the minute mineral components of all rocks can usually be ascertained only by microscopic examination. But it is easy to see that a sandstone or grit consists of more or less rounded, water-worn sand grains and if it contains dull, weathered particles of feldspar, shining scales of mica or small crystals of calcite these also rarely escape observation. Shales and clay rocks generally are soft, fine grained, often laminated and not infrequently contain minute organisms or fragments of plants. Limestones are easily marked with a knife-blade, effervesce readily with weak cold acid and often contain entire or broken shells or other fossils. The crystalline nature of a granite or basalt is obvious at a glance, and while the former contains white or pink feldspar, clear vitreous quartz and glancing flakes of mica, the other shows yellow-green olivine, black augite, and gray stratiated plagioclase.

Other simple tools include the blowpipe (to test the fusibility of detached crystals), the goniometer, the magnet, the magnifying glass and the specific gravity balance.

=== Microscopic characteristics ===
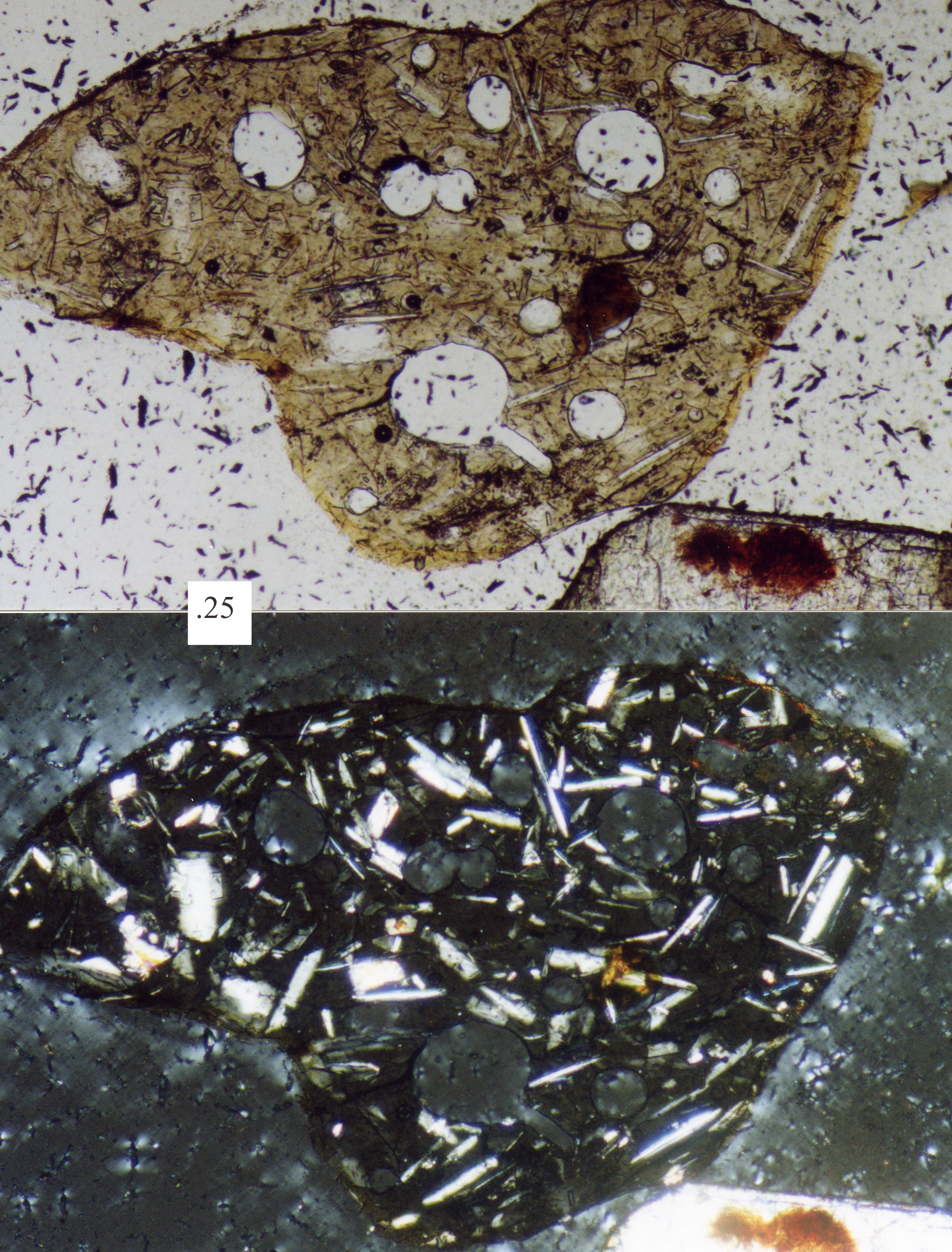
Photomicrograph of a volcanic sand grain; upper picture is plane-polarized light, bottom picture is cross-polarized light, scale box at left-center is 0.25 millimeter.

When dealing with unfamiliar types or with rocks so fine grained that their component minerals cannot be determined with the aid of a hand lens, a microscope is used. Characteristics observed under the microscope include colour, colour variation under plane polarised light (pleochroism, produced by the lower Nicol prism, or more recently polarising films), fracture characteristics of the grains, refractive index (in comparison to the mounting adhesive, typically Canada balsam), and optical symmetry (birefringent or isotropic). In toto, these characteristics are sufficient to identify the mineral, and often to quite tightly estimate its major element composition. The process of identifying minerals under the microscope is fairly subtle, but also mechanistic – it would be possible to develop an identification key that would allow a computer to do it. Recently, the field of digital petrography has been developing, including through the use of artificial intelligence technologies. The more difficult and skilful part of optical petrography is identifying the interrelationships between grains and relating them to features seen in hand-sized specimen, at outcrop, or in mapping.

=== Separation of components ===
Separation of the ingredients of a crushed rock powder to obtain pure samples for analysis is a common approach. It may be performed with a powerful, adjustable-strength electromagnet. A weak magnetic field attracts magnetite, then haematite and other iron ores. Silicates that contain iron follow in definite order—biotite, enstatite, augite, hornblende, garnet, and similar ferro-magnesian minerals are successively abstracted. Finally, only the colorless, non-magnetic compounds, such as muscovite, calcite, quartz, and feldspar remain. Chemical methods also are useful.

A weak acid dissolves calcite from crushed limestone, leaving only dolomite, silicates, or quartz. Hydrofluoric acid attacks feldspar before quartz and, if used cautiously, dissolves these and any glassy material in a rock powder before it dissolves augite or hypersthene.

Methods of separation by specific gravity have a still wider application. The simplest of these is levigation, which is extensively employed in mechanical analysis of soils and treatment of ores, but is not so successful with rocks, as their components do not, as a rule, differ greatly in specific gravity. Fluids are used that do not attack most rock-forming minerals, but have a high specific gravity. Solutions of potassium mercuric iodide (sp. gr. 3.196), cadmium borotungstate (sp. gr. 3.30), methylene iodide (sp. gr. 3.32), bromoform (sp. gr. 2.86), or acetylene bromide (sp. gr. 3.00) are the principal fluids employed. They may be diluted (with water, benzene, etc.) or concentrated by evaporation.

If the rock is granite consisting of biotite (sp. gr. 3.1), muscovite (sp. gr. 2.85), quartz (sp. gr. 2.65), oligoclase (sp. gr. 2.64), and orthoclase (sp. gr. 2.56), the crushed minerals float in methylene iodide. On gradual dilution with benzene they precipitate in the order above. Simple in theory, these methods are tedious in practice, especially as it is common for one rock-making mineral to enclose another. Expert handling of fresh and suitable rocks yields excellent results.

=== Chemical analysis ===
In addition to naked-eye and microscopic investigation, chemical research methods are of great practical importance to the petrographer. Crushed and separated powders, obtained by the processes above, may be analyzed to determine chemical composition of minerals in the rock qualitatively or quantitatively. Chemical testing and microscopic examination of minute grains is a valuable means of discriminating between mineral components of fine-grained rocks.

Thus, the presence of apatite in rock-sections is established by covering a bare rock-section with ammonium molybdate solution. A turbid yellow precipitate forms over the crystals of the mineral in question (indicating the presence of phosphates). Many silicates are insoluble in acids and cannot be tested in this way, but others are partly dissolved, leaving a film of gelatinous silica that can be stained with coloring matters, such as the aniline dyes (nepheline, analcite, zeolites, etc.).

Complete chemical analysis of rocks are also widely used and important, especially in describing new species. Rock analysis has of late years (largely under the influence of the chemical laboratory of the United States Geological Survey) reached a high pitch of refinement and complexity. As many as twenty or twenty-five components may be determined, but for practical purposes a knowledge of the relative proportions of silica, alumina, ferrous and ferric oxides, magnesia, lime, potash, soda and water carry us a long way in determining a rock's position in the conventional classifications.

A chemical analysis is usually sufficient to indicate whether a rock is igneous or sedimentary, and in either case to accurately show what subdivision of these classes it belongs to. In the case of metamorphic rocks it often establishes whether the original mass was a sediment or of volcanic origin.

=== Specific gravity ===
Specific gravity of rocks is determined by use of a balance and pycnometer. It is greatest in rocks containing the most magnesia, iron, and heavy metal while least in rocks rich in alkalis, silica, and water. It diminishes with weathering. Generally, the specific gravity of rocks with the same chemical composition is higher if highly crystalline and lower if wholly or partly vitreous. The specific gravity of the more common rocks range from about 2.5 to 3.2.

== Archaeological applications ==
Archaeologists use petrography to identify mineral components in pottery. This information ties the artifacts to geological areas where the raw materials for the pottery were obtained. In addition to clay, potters often used rock fragments, usually called "temper" or "aplastics", to modify the clay's properties. The geological information obtained from the pottery components provides insight into how potters selected and used local and non-local resources. Archaeologists are able to determine whether pottery found in a particular location was locally produced or traded from elsewhere. This kind of information, along with other evidence, can support conclusions about settlement patterns, group and individual mobility, social contacts, and trade networks. In addition, an understanding of how certain minerals are altered at specific temperatures can allow archaeological petrographers to infer aspects of the ceramic production process itself, such as minimum and maximum temperatures reached during the original firing of the pot.

== See also ==
- Ceramic petrography
