= Meyer hardness test =

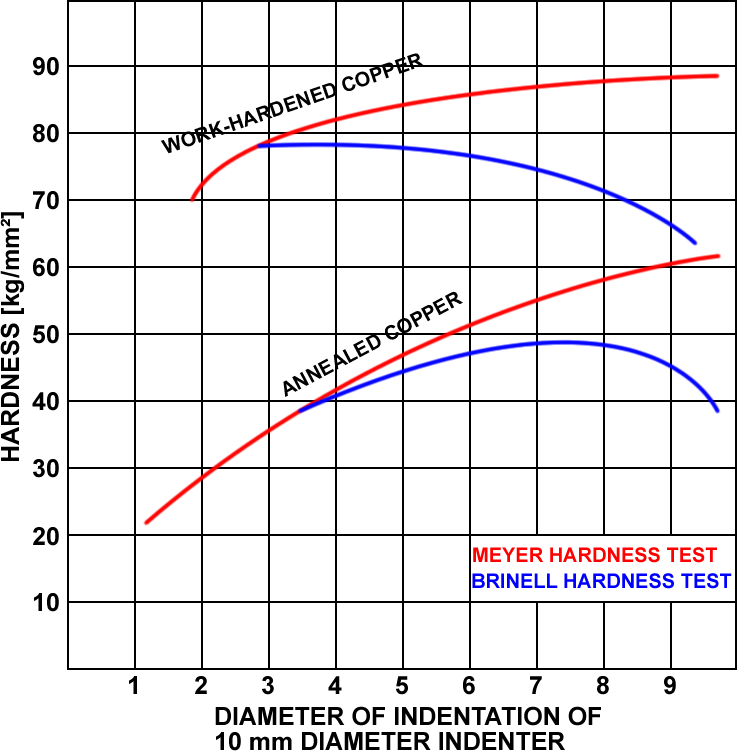
This graph shows the differences between the Brinell hardness test and the Meyer hardness test. Notice that the Brinell test can report the same hardness value for a given specimen twice depending on the load.

The Meyer hardness test is a hardness test based upon projected area of an impression. The hardness, $H$, is defined as the maximum load, $P_\text{max}$ divided by the projected area of the indent, $A_\text{p}$.

$$H=\frac{P_\text{max}} {A_\text{p}}.$$

This is a more fundamental measurement of hardness than other hardness tests which are based on the surface area of an indentation. The principle behind the test is that the mean pressure required to test the material is the measurement of the hardness of the material. Units of megapascals (MPa) are frequently used for reporting Meyer hardness, but any unit of pressure can be used.

The test was originally defined for spherical indenters, but can be applied to any indenter shape. It is often the definition used in nanoindentation testing. An advantage of the Meyer test is that it is less sensitive to the applied load, especially compared to the Brinell hardness test. For cold worked materials the Meyer hardness is relatively constant and independent of load, whereas for the Brinell hardness test it decreases with higher loads. For annealed materials the Meyer hardness increases continuously with load due to strain hardening.

Based on Meyer's law, hardness values from this test can be converted into Brinell hardness values, and vice versa.

The Meyer hardness test was devised by Eugene Meyer of the Materials Testing Laboratory at the Imperial School of Technology, Charlottenburg, Germany, circa 1908.

== See also ==
- Brinelling
- Hardness comparison
- Knoop hardness test
- Leeb rebound hardness test
- Rockwell scale
- Vickers hardness test
