= Rockwell hardness test =

Hardness scale

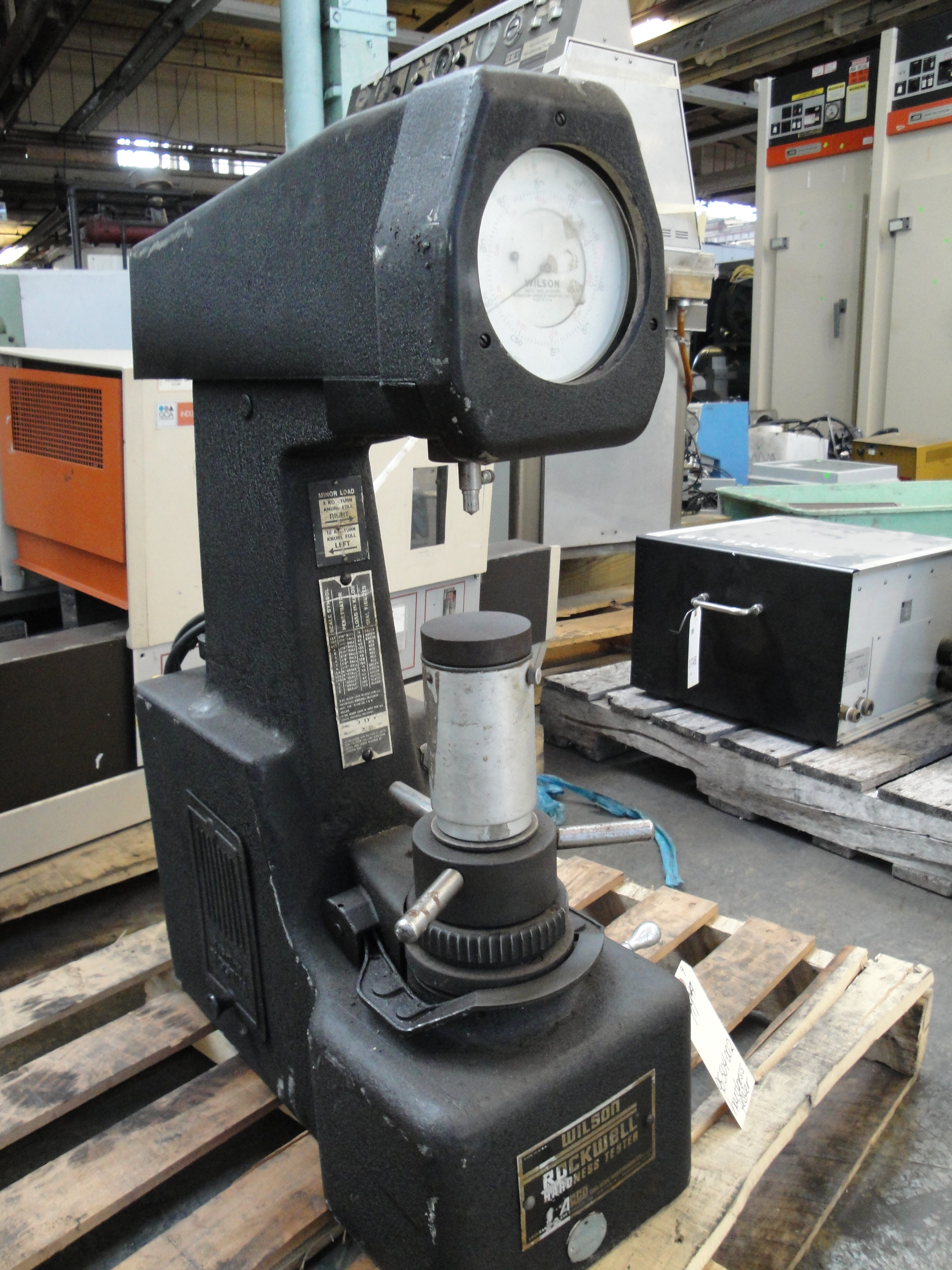
A Rockwell hardness tester

The Rockwell hardness test is a hardness test based on indentation hardness of a material. The Rockwell test measures the depth of penetration of an indenter under a large load (major load) compared to the penetration made by a preload (minor load). There are different scales, denoted by a single letter, that use different loads or indenters. The result is a dimensionless number noted as HRA, HRB, HRC, etc., where the last letter is the respective Rockwell scale. Larger numbers correspond to harder materials.

When testing metals, indentation hardness correlates linearly with tensile strength.

== History ==
The differential depth hardness measurement was conceived in 1908 by Viennese professor Paul Ludwik in his book Die Kegelprobe (crudely, "the cone test"). The differential-depth method subtracted out the errors associated with the mechanical imperfections of the system, such as backlash and surface imperfections. The Brinell hardness test, invented in Sweden, was developed earlier – in 1900 – but it was slow, not useful on fully hardened steel, and left too large an impression to be considered nondestructive.

Hugh M. Rockwell (1890–1957) and Stanley P. Rockwell (1886–1940) from Connecticut in the United States co-invented the "Rockwell hardness tester," a differential-depth machine. They applied for a patent on July 15, 1914. The requirement for this tester was to quickly determine the effects of heat treatment on steel bearing races. The application was approved on February 11, 1919, for U.S. patent 1,294,171. At the time of invention, both Hugh and Stanley Rockwell worked for the New Departure Manufacturing Co. of Bristol, CT. New Departure was a major ball bearing manufacturer which in 1916 became part of United Motors and, shortly thereafter, General Motors Corp.

After leaving the Connecticut company, Stanley Rockwell, then in Syracuse, NY, applied for an improvement to the original invention on September 11, 1919, which was approved on November 18, 1924. The new tester held U.S. patent 1,516,207. Rockwell moved to West Hartford, CT, and made an additional improvement in 1921. Stanley collaborated with instrument manufacturer Charles H. Wilson of the Wilson-Mauelen Company in 1920 to commercialize his invention and develop standardized testing machines. Stanley started a heat-treating firm circa 1923, the Stanley P. Rockwell Company, which operated until 2012. The building, which still stands, was empty in 2016. The later-named Wilson Mechanical Instrument Company has changed ownership over the years, and was acquired by Instron Corp. in 1993.

== Models and operation ==
Force diagram of Rockwell test

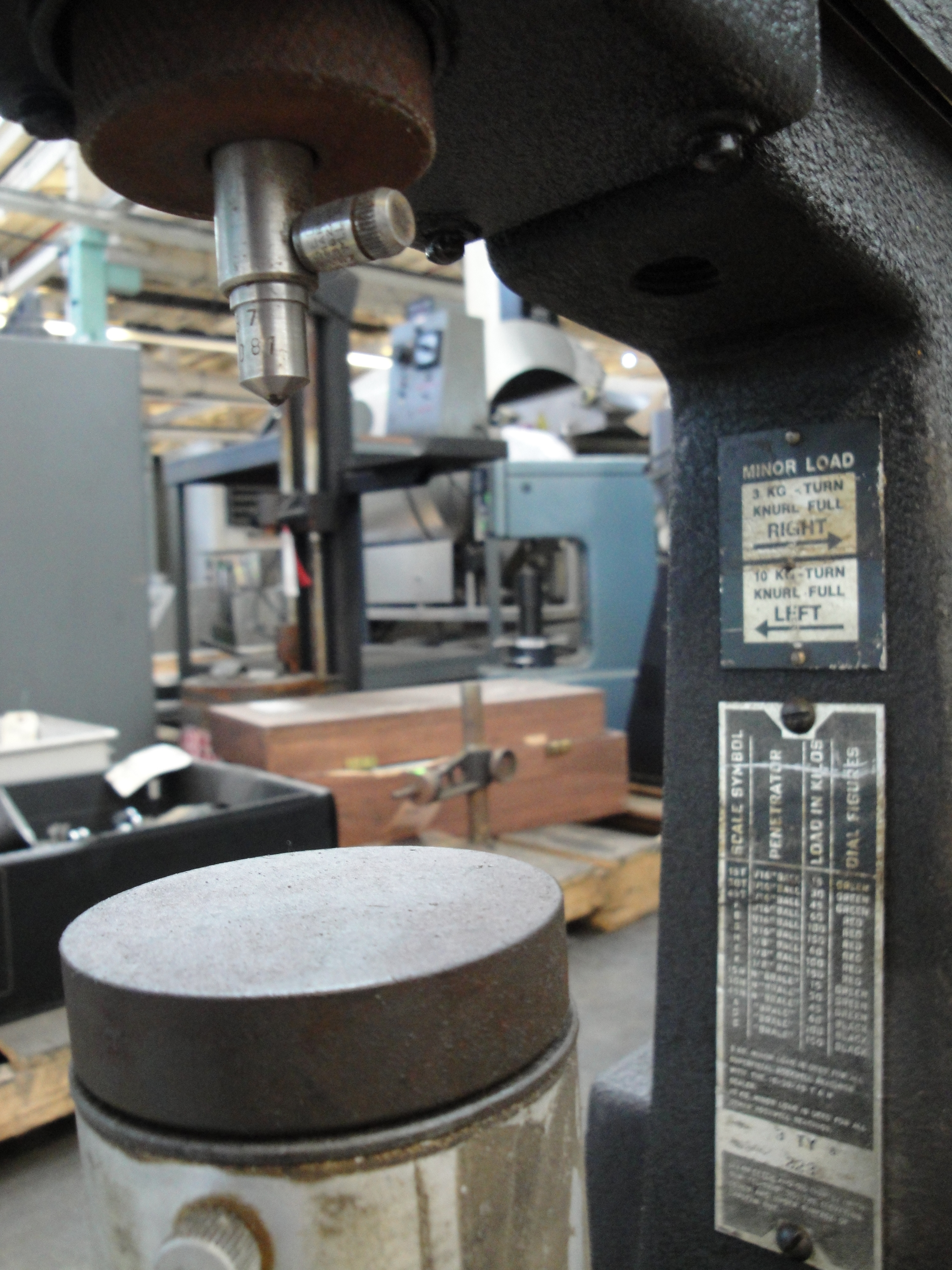
A closeup of the indenter and anvil on a Rockwell-type hardness tester

The Rockwell hardness test can be conducted on different types of hardness testers. Benchtop hardness testers can be found either in a digital or analog model. Digital models utilize a digital display whereas the analog models display results on a dial on the machine. Other testers are portable.

The determination of the Rockwell hardness of a material involves the application of a minor load followed by a major load. The minor load establishes the zero position. The major load is applied, then removed while still maintaining the minor load. The depth of penetration from the zero datum is measured, on which a harder material gives a lower measure. That is, the penetration depth and hardness are inversely proportional. The Rockwell test does not use any optical equipment to measure the hardness indention, rather all calculations are done within the machine to measure the indention in the specimen.

The equation for Rockwell hardness is $HR = N-h*d$, where d is the depth in mm (from the zero load point), and N and h are scale factors that depend on the scale of the test being used (see following section).

It is typically used in engineering and metallurgy. Its commercial popularity arises from its speed, reliability, robustness, resolution and small area of indentation.

Legacy Rockwell hardness testers operation steps:

1. Load an initial force: Rockwell hardness test initial test force is 10 kgf (98 N; 22 lbf); superficial Rockwell hardness test initial test force is 3 kgf (29 N; 6.6 lbf).
2. Load main load: reference below form / table 'Scales and values'.
3. Leave the main load for a "dwell time" sufficient for indentation to come to a halt.
4. Release load; the Rockwell value will typically display on a dial or screen automatically.

In order to get a reliable reading the thickness of the test-piece should be at least 10 times the depth of the indentation. Also, readings should be taken from a flat perpendicular surface, because convex surfaces give lower readings. A correction factor can be used if the hardness of a convex surface is to be measured.

== Scales and values ==
There are several alternative scales, the most commonly used being the "B" and "C" scales. Both express hardness as an arbitrary dimensionless number.

Various Rockwell scales
Scale	Abbreviation^{§}	Major load^{*} (kgf)	Indenter	Use	N	h
A	HRA	60	spheroconical diamond^{†}	Cemented carbides, thin steel, shallow case-hardened steel	100	500
B	HRB	100	1/16 in (1.59 mm) ball	Copper alloys, soft steels, aluminum, malleable iron	130	500
C	HRC	150	spheroconical diamond^{†}	Steel, deep case hardened steel, and stainless steel, hard cast irons, pearlitic malleable iron, titanium, titanium alloys, and other materials harder than 100 HRB	100	500
D	HRD	100	spheroconical diamond^{†}	Thin steel and medium case-hardened steel and pearlitic malleable iron	100	500
E	HRE	100	1/8 in (3.18 mm) ball	Cast iron, aluminum and magnesium alloys, bearing metals, thermoset plastics	130	500
F	HRF	60	1/16 in (1.59 mm) ball	Annealed copper alloy, thin soft sheet metals	130	500
G	HRG	150	1/16 in (1.59 mm) ball	Phosphor bronze, beryllium copper, malleable irons.	130	500
H	HRH	60	1/8 in (3.18 mm) ball	Aluminum, Zinc, Lead	130	500
K	HRK	150	1/8 in (3.18 mm) ball	Bearing alloy, tin, hard plastic materials	130	500
L	HRL	60	1/4 in (6.35 mm) ball	Bearing metals and other very soft or thin materials.	130	500
M	HRM	100	1/4 in (6.35 mm) ball	Thermoplastics, bearing metals and other very soft or thin materials	130	500
P	HRP	150	1/4 in (6.35 mm) ball	Bearing metals and other very soft or thin materials	130	500
R	HRR	60	1/2 in (12.70 mm) ball	Thermoplastics, bearing metals, and other very soft or thin materials	130	500
S	HRS	100	1/2 in (12.70 mm) ball	Bearing metals and other very soft or thin materials	130	500
V	HRV	150	1/2 in (12.70 mm) ball	Bearing metals and other very soft or thin materials	130	500
15T, 30T, 45T		15, 30, 45	1/16 in (1.59 mm) ball	Superficial: for soft coatings	100	1000
15N, 30N, 45N		15, 30, 45	spheroconical diamond^{†}	Superficial: for case-hardened materials	100	1000
^{*} Except for the superficial scales where it is 3 kgf, the minor load is 10 kgf.
^{†}Also called a Brale indenter, is made with a conical diamond of 120° ± 0.35° included angle and a tip radius of 0.200 ± 0.010 mm.
^{§}The Rockwell number precedes the scale abbreviations (e.g., 60 HRC), except for the "Superficial scales" where they follow the abbreviations, separated by a ‘-’ (e.g., 30N-25).

- Except for testing thin materials in accordance with A623, the steel indenter balls have been replaced by tungsten carbide balls of the varying diameters. When a ball indenter is used, the letter "W" is used to indicate a tungsten carbide ball was used, and the letter "S" indicates the use of a steel ball. E.g.: 70 HRBW indicates the reading was 70 in the Rockwell B scale using a tungsten carbide indenter.

The superficial Rockwell scales use lower loads and shallower impressions on brittle and very thin materials. The 45N scale employs a 45-kgf load on a diamond cone-shaped Brale indenter, and can be used on dense ceramics. The 15T scale employs a 15-kgf load on a 1/16-inch-diameter (1.588 mm) hardened steel ball, and can be used on sheet metal.

The B and C scales overlap, such that readings below HRC 20 and those above HRB 100, generally considered unreliable, need not be taken or specified.

Typical values include:

- Very hard steel (e.g. chisels, quality knife blades): HRC 55–66 (Hardened High Speed Carbon and Tool Steels such as M2, W2, O1, CPM-M4, and D2, as well as many of the newer powder metallurgy Stainless Steels such as CPM-S30V, CPM-154, ZDP-189. There are alloys that hold a HRC upwards 68-70, such as the Hitachi developed HAP72. These are extremely hard, but also somewhat brittle.)
- Axes: about HRC 45–55
- Brass: HRB 55 (Low brass, UNS C24000, H01 Temper) to HRB 93 (Cartridge Brass, UNS C26000 (260 Brass), H10 Temper)

Several other scales, including the extensive A-scale, are used for specialized applications. There are special scales for measuring case-hardened specimens.

== Standards ==
- International (ISO)
  - ISO 6508-1: Metallic materials—Rockwell hardness test—Part 1: Test method
  - ISO 6508-2: Metallic materials—Rockwell hardness test—Part 2: Verification and calibration of testing machines and indenters
  - ISO 6508-3: Metallic materials—Rockwell hardness test—Part 3: Calibration of reference blocks
  - ISO 2039-2: Plastics—Determination of hardness—Part 2: Rockwell hardness
- US standard (ASTM International)
  - ASTM E18: Standard Test Methods for Rockwell Hardness of Metallic Materials

== See also ==
- Brinell hardness test
- Hardness comparison
- Janka hardness test
- Knoop hardness test
- Leeb rebound hardness test
- Meyer hardness test
- Mineral
- Mohs scale of hardness
- Shore durometer
- Tensile strength
- Vickers hardness test
