= Scleroscope =

Instrument used to measure rebound hardness

A scleroscope is a device used to measure rebound hardness. It consists of a steel ball dropped from a fixed height. The device was invented in 1907. As an improvement on this rough method, the Leeb Rebound Hardness Test, invented in the 1970s, uses the ratio of impact and rebound velocities (as measured by a magnetic inducer) to determine hardness.

== See also ==
- Hardness – Measure of a material's resistance to localized plastic deformation
- Sclerometer – Instrument used to measure the hardness of a material
- Tribometer – Instrument that measures friction and wear between surfaces
