= Meyer's law =

Meyer's law is an empirical relation between the size of a hardness test indentation and the load required to leave the indentation. The formula was devised by Eugene Meyer of the Materials Testing Laboratory at the Imperial School of Technology, Charlottenburg, Germany, circa 1908.

== Equation ==
It takes the form:

$$P\,=\,kd^n$$

where

- P is the pressure in megapascals
- k is the resistance of the material to initial penetration
- n is Meyer's index, a measure of the effect of the deformation on the hardness of the material
- d is the chordal diameter (diameter of the indentation)

The index n usually lies between the values of 2, for fully strain hardened materials, and 2.5, for fully annealed materials. It is roughly related to the strain hardening coefficient in the equation for the true stress-true strain curve by adding 2. Note, however, that below approximately d = 0.5 mm (0.020 in) the value of n can surpass 3. Because of this, Meyer's law is often restricted to values of d greater than 0.5 mm up to the diameter of the indenter.

The variables k and n are also dependent on the size of the indenter. Despite this, it has been found that the values can be related using the equation:

$$P = k_1d_1^{n_1} = k_2d_2^{n_2} = k_3d_3^{n_3} = ...$$

Meyer's law is often used to relate hardness values based on the fact that if the weight is quartered, the diameter of the indenter is halved. For instance, the hardness values are the same for a test load of 3000 kgf with a 10 mm indenter and for a test load of 750 kgf with a 5 mm diameter indenter. This relationship isn't perfect, but its percent error is relatively small.

A modified form of this equation was put forth by Onitsch:

$$P\,=\,1.854kd^{n-2}$$

== See also ==
- Meyer hardness test
