= Hardness comparison =

Standard hardness conversion table

A variety of hardness-testing methods are available, including the Vickers, Brinell, Rockwell, Meyer and Leeb tests. Although it is impossible in many cases to give an exact conversion, it is possible to give an approximate material-specific comparison table for steels.

== Hardness comparison table ==
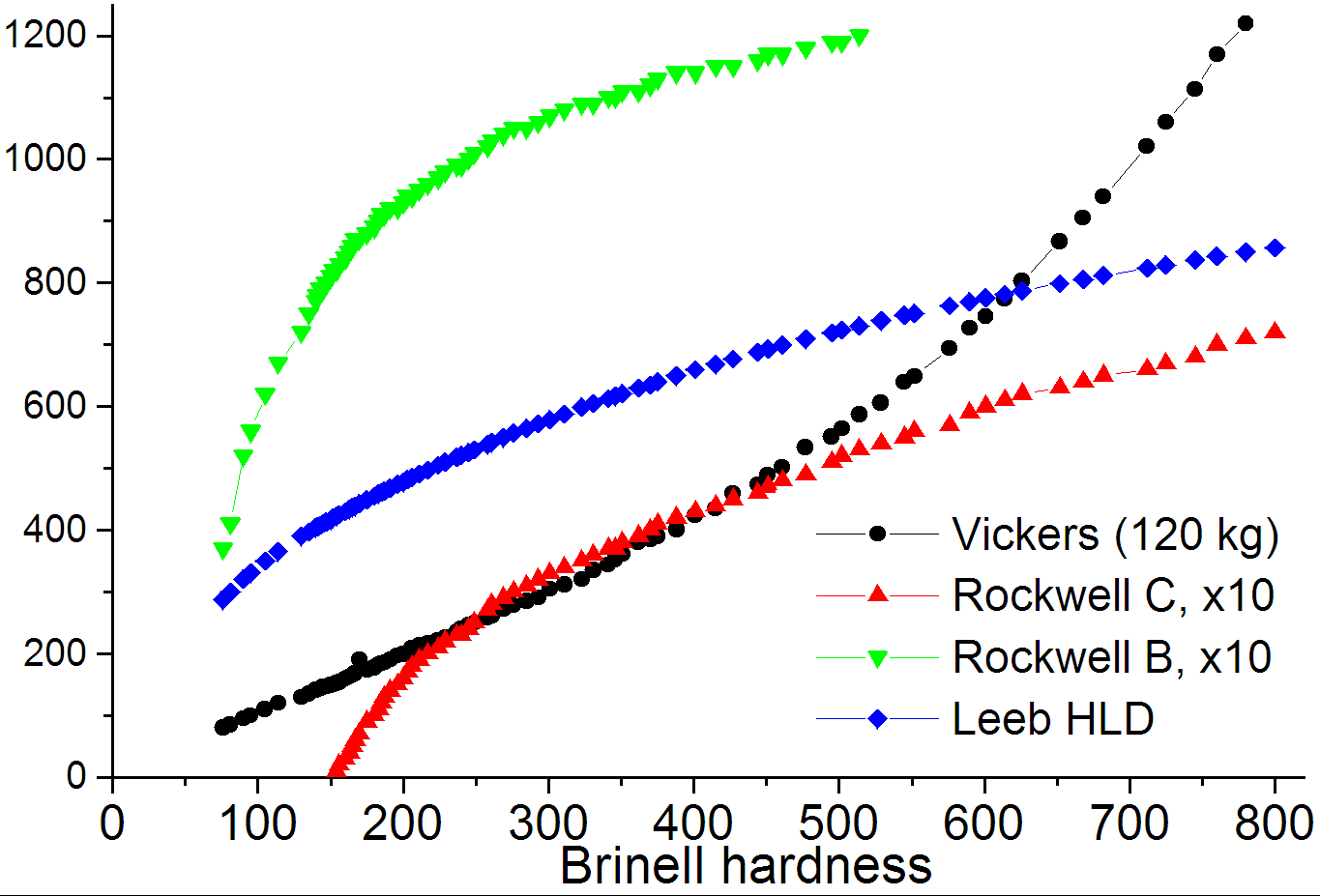

Brinell HB (10 mm Ball, 3000 kgf load)	Vickers HV (5 kgf)	Rockwell C HRC (120 degree cone 150 kgf)	Rockwell B HRB (1/16" ball 100 kgf)	Leeb HLD
800	-	72	-	856
780	1220	71	-	850
760	1210	70	-	843
745	1114	68	-	837
725	1060	67	-	829
712	1021	66	-	824
682	940	65	-	812
668	905	64	-	806
652	867	63	-	799
626	803	62	-	787
614	775	61	-	782
601	746	60	-	776
590	727	59	-	770
576	694	57	-	763
552	649	56	-	751
545	639	55	-	748
529	606	54	-	739
514	587	53	120	731
502	565	52	119	724
495	551	51	119	719
477	534	49	118	709
461	502	48	117	699
451	489	47	117	693
444	474	46	116	688
427	460	45	115	677
415	435	44	115	669
401	423	43	114	660
388	401	42	114	650
375	390	41	113	640
370	385	40	112	635
362	380	39	111	630
351	361	38	111	622
346	352	37	110	617
341	344	37	110	613
331	335	36	109	605
323	320	35	109	599
311	312	34	108	588
301	305	33	107	579
293	291	32	106	572
285	285	31	105	565
276	278	30	105	557
269	272	29	104	550
261	261	28	103	542
258	258	27	102	539
249	250	25	101	530
245	246	24	100	526
240	240	23	99	521
237	235	23	99	518
229	226	22	98	510
224	221	21	97	505
217	217	20	96	497
211	213	19	95	491
206	209	18	94	485
203	201	17	94	482
200	199	16	93	478
196	197	15	92	474
191	190	14	92	468
187	186	13	91	463
185	184	12	91	461
183	183	11	90	459
180	177	10	89	455
175	174	9	88	449
170	171	7	87	443
167	168	6	87	439
165	165	5	86	437
163	162	4	85	434
160	159	3	84	430
156	154	2	83	425
154	152	1	82	423
152	150	-	82	420
150	149	-	81	417
147	147	-	80	413
145	146	-	79	411
143	144	-	79	408
141	142	-	78	405
140	141	-	77	404
135	135	-	75	389
130	130	-	72	390
114	120	-	67	365
105	110	-	62	350
95	100	-	56	331
90	95	-	52	321
81	85	-	41	300
76	80	-	37	287
