= Leeb rebound hardness test =

Method of testing metal hardness

The Leeb Rebound Hardness Test (LRHT) invented by Swiss company Proceq SA is one of the four most used methods for testing metal hardness. This portable method is mainly used for testing sufficiently large workpieces (mainly above 1 kg).

It measures the coefficient of restitution. It is a form of nondestructive testing.

== History ==
The Equotip (later on also called simultaneously as Leeb method) rebound hardness test method was developed in the year 1975 by civil engineer Dietmar Leeb and electronics engineer Dr. Marco Brandestini at Proceq SA to provide a portable hardness test for metals. It was developed as an alternative to the unwieldy and sometimes intricate traditional hardness measuring equipment. The first Leeb rebound product on the market was named “Equotip”, a phrase that still is used synonymously with “Leeb rebound” due to the wide circulation of the “Equotip” product.

Traditional hardness measurements, e.g., those of Rockwell, Vickers, and Brinell, are stationary, requiring fixed workstations in segregated testing areas or laboratories. Most of the time, these methods are selective, involving destructive tests on samples. From individual results, these tests draw statistical conclusions for entire batches. The portability of Leeb testers can sometimes help to achieve higher testing rates without destruction of samples, which in turn simplifies processes and reduces cost.

== Method ==
The traditional methods are based on well-defined physical indentation hardness tests. Very hard indenters of defined geometries and sizes are continuously pressed into the material under a particular force. Deformation parameters, such as the indentation depth in the Rockwell method, are recorded to give measures of hardness.

According to the dynamic Leeb principle, the hardness value is derived from the energy loss of a defined impact body after impacting on a metal sample, similar to the Shore scleroscope. The Leeb quotient (v_{i},v_{r}) is taken as a measure of the energy loss by plastic deformation: the impact body rebounds faster from harder test samples than it does from softer ones, resulting in a greater value 1000×v_{r}/v_{i}. A magnetic impact body permits the velocity to be deduced from the voltage induced by the body as it moves through the measuring coil. The quotient 1000×v_{r}/v_{i} is quoted in the Leeb rebound hardness unit HLx (where x indicates the probe and impact body type: D, DC, DL, C, G, S, E) .

While in the traditional static tests the test force is applied uniformly with increasing magnitude, dynamic testing methods apply an instantaneous load. A test takes a mere 2 seconds and, using the standard probe D, leaves an indentation of just ~0.5 mm in diameter on steel or steel casting with a Leeb hardness of 600 HLD. By comparison, a Brinell indentation on the same material is ~3 mm (hardness value ~400 HBW 10/3000), with a standard-compliant measuring time of ~15 seconds plus the time for measuring the indentation.

Theoretical background of the rebound hardness test is discussed in detail in.

== Scales ==
Depending on the probe (“impact device”) and indenter (“impact body”) types that vary by geometry, size, weight, material and spring force, diverse impact devices and hardness units are distinguished, e.g.:

- Equotip impact device D with hardness unit HLD
- Equotip impact device G with hardness unit HLG
- Equotip impact device C with hardness unit HLC
- Equotip impact device E with hardness unit HLE
- Equotip impact device DL with hardness unit HLDL
- Equotip impact device S with hardness unit HLS
- Equotip impact device DC with hardness unit HLDC

Generally, impact device types are optimized for certain application fields. This is similar to using various indenter geometries and test loads in Rockwell (e.g. HRA, HRB, HRC), Brinell and Vickers. Equotip hardness results in HLx are often converted to the traditional hardness scales HRC, HB and HV mainly for convention reasons between supplier and customer.

== Standards ==
  - DGZfP Guideline “Mobile Härteprüfung“
  - VDI/VDE Guideline 2616 Part 1 “Hardness testing of metallic materials”
- American standards:
  - ASTM A956 “Standard Test Method for Leeb Hardness Testing of Steel Products”
  - ASTM E140 - 12be1 "Standard Hardness Conversion Tables for Metals Relationship Among Brinell Hardness, Vickers Hardness, Rockwell Hardness, Superficial Hardness, Knoop Hardness, Scleroscope Hardness, and Leeb Hardness"
- International standards:
  - ISO/DIS 16859-1 "Metallic materials - Leeb hardness test - Part 1: Test method"
  - ISO/DIS 16859-2 "Metallic materials - Leeb hardness test - Part 2: Verification and calibration of the testing devices"
  - ISO/DIS 16859-3 "Metallic materials - Leeb hardness test - Part 3: Calibration of reference test blocks"

== See also ==
- Meyer hardness test
