= Brinell hardness test =

Brinell scale of hardness

Force diagram

The Brinell hardness test /brəˈnɛl/ measures the indentation hardness of materials. It determines hardness through the scale of penetration of an indenter, loaded on a material test-piece. It is one of several definitions of hardness in materials science. The hardness scale is expressed in terms of a Brinell hardness value, sometimes referred to as the Brinell hardness number but formally expressed as HBW, meaning Hardness Brinell Wolfram; Wolfram refers to the tungsten carbide ball indenter used during the test.

The test was named after Johan August Brinell (1849-1925) who developed the method at the end of the 19th century.

== History ==
Premiered by Swedish engineer Johan August Brinell at the 1900 Paris Exposition, it was the first widely used and standardised hardness test in engineering and metallurgy. The large size of indentation and thus possible damage to test-pieces limits its usefulness. However, it also had the useful feature that the hardness value divided by two gave the approximate UTS in ksi for steels. This feature contributed to its early adoption over competing hardness tests.

== Test details ==
The test uses a tungsten carbide ball indenter and a precisely controlled force; the ratio of ball diameter to test force is a function of the material being tested. Most commonly the test is employed for ferrous metals and uses a 10mm ball and 29,000 N (3,000 kgf), although it can go as low as 1mm and 9.8 N (1 kgf).

Although the maximum test force is 29,420 Newtons, there are hand-pumped, hydraulic, portable Brinell testers less than 58 cm (23 in) in height that can develop this force and hold it for sufficient time to perform a Brinell test. One such is pictured.

As there are numerous situations where the failure of a metal component due to it being of the wrong hardness could have catastrophic consequences, Brinell testing is governed by International Standards Organisation (ISO) and American Society for Testing and Materials (ASTM) rules. Brinell testing machines must be calibrated regularly and in many industries daily checks are carried out using calibration blocks of a precise, known hardness, against which the machine measurements of such blocks are compared. A block of this type is pictured, clearly showing the five indentations made during its calibration.

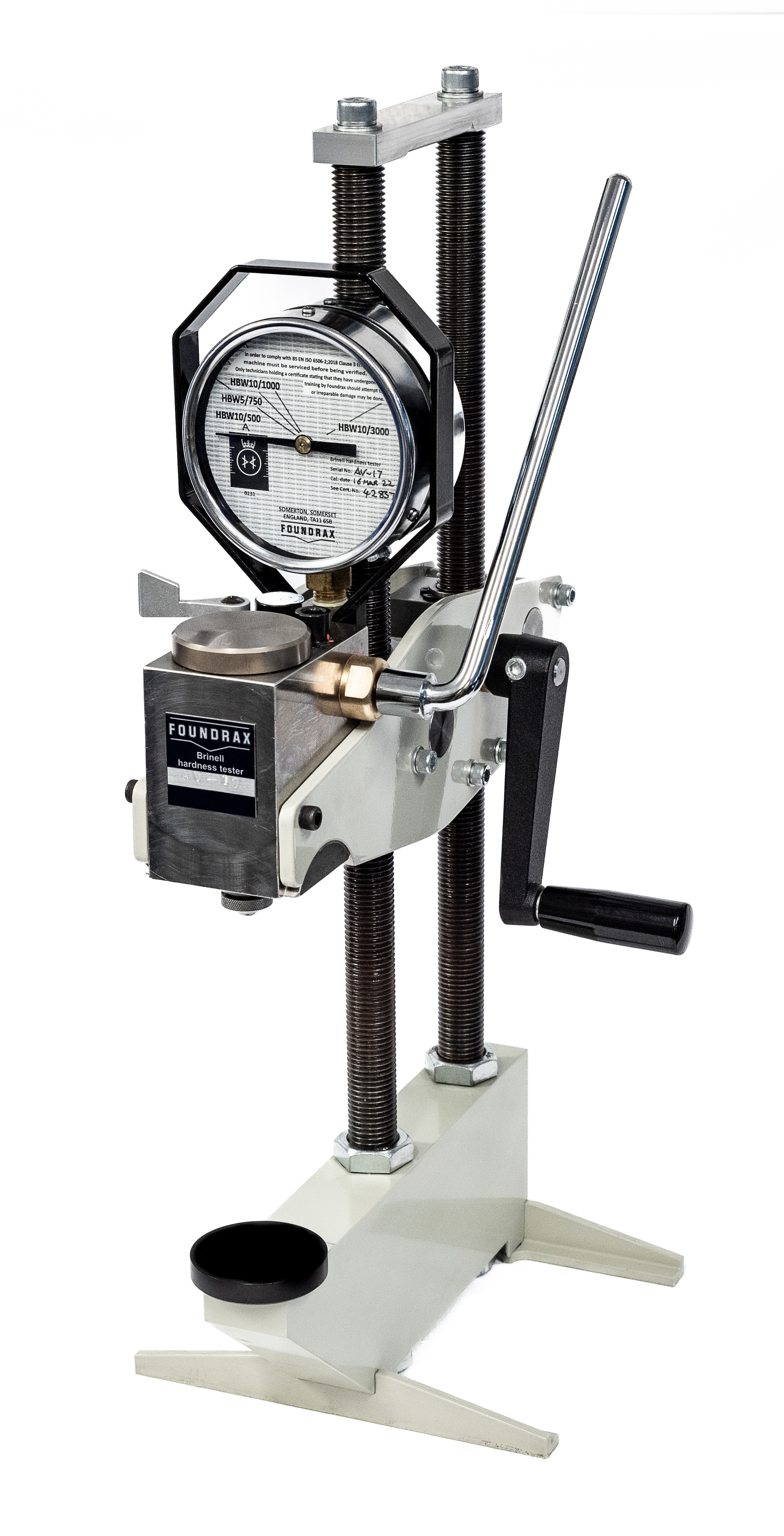
A hand-portable, hydraulic Brinell hardness tester

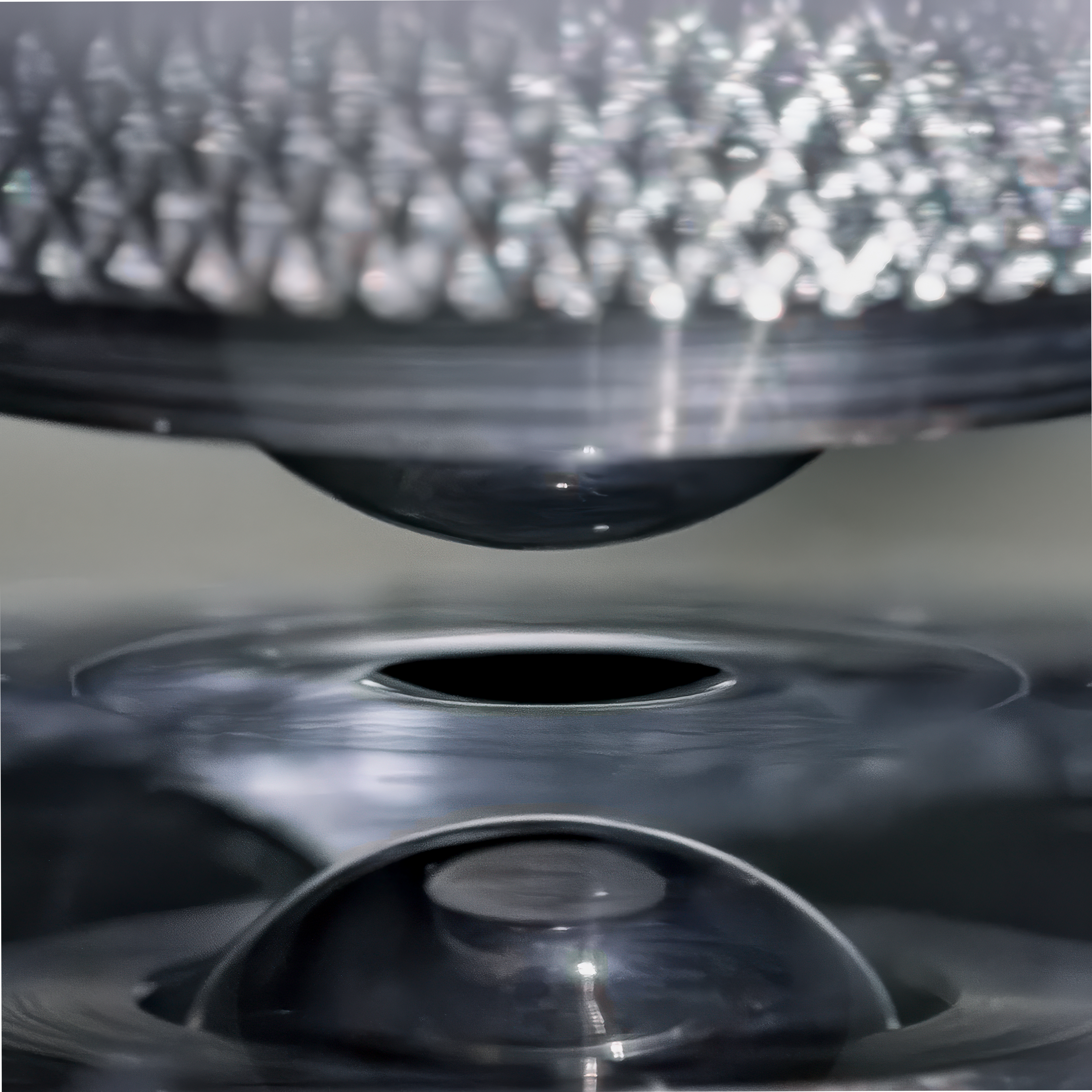
A close up image of the indenter of a Brinell hardness tester and an indentation

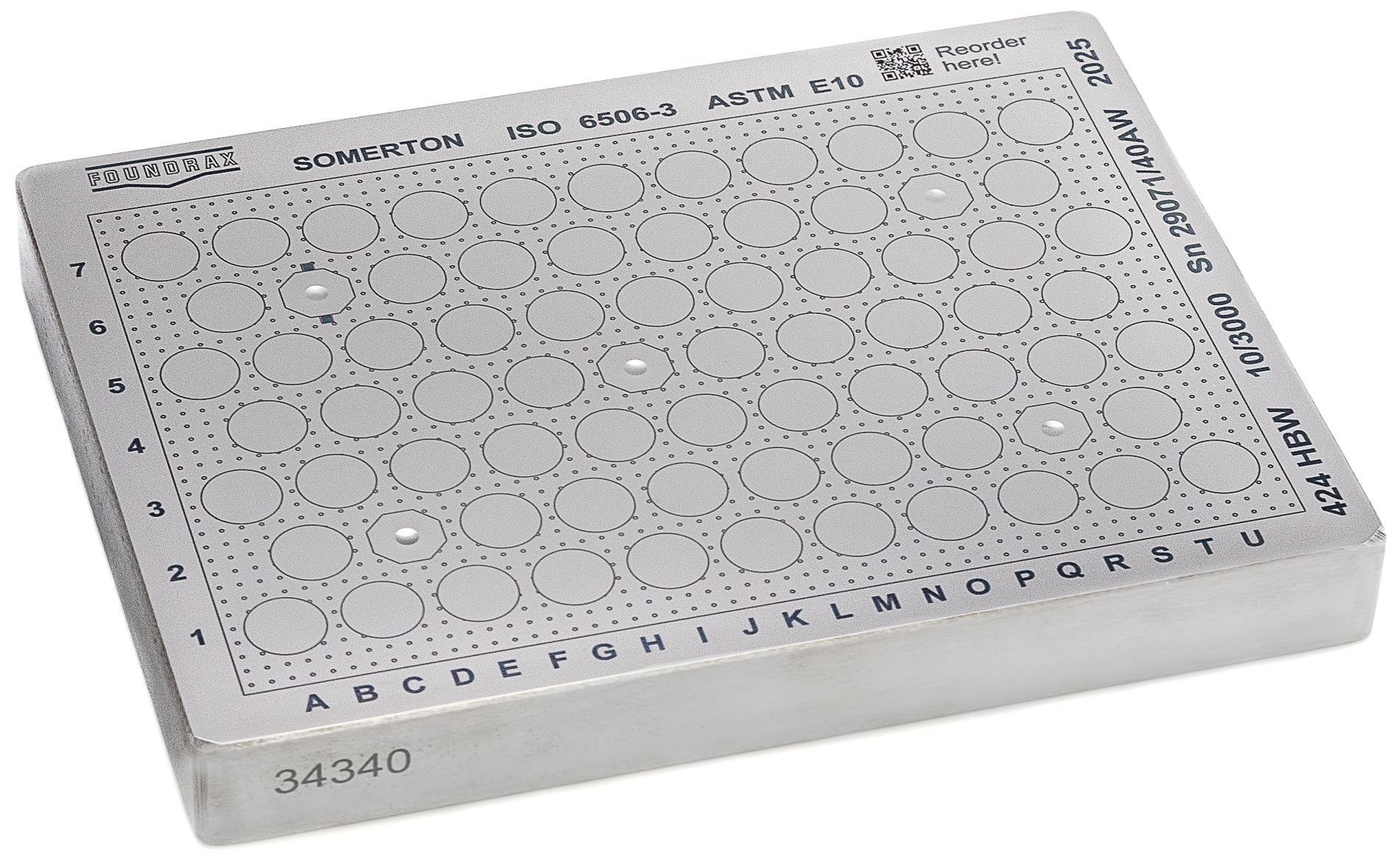
A Brinell calibration block used for the indirect verification of the accuracy of Brinell testing machines (photo courtesy of Foundrax Engineering Products).

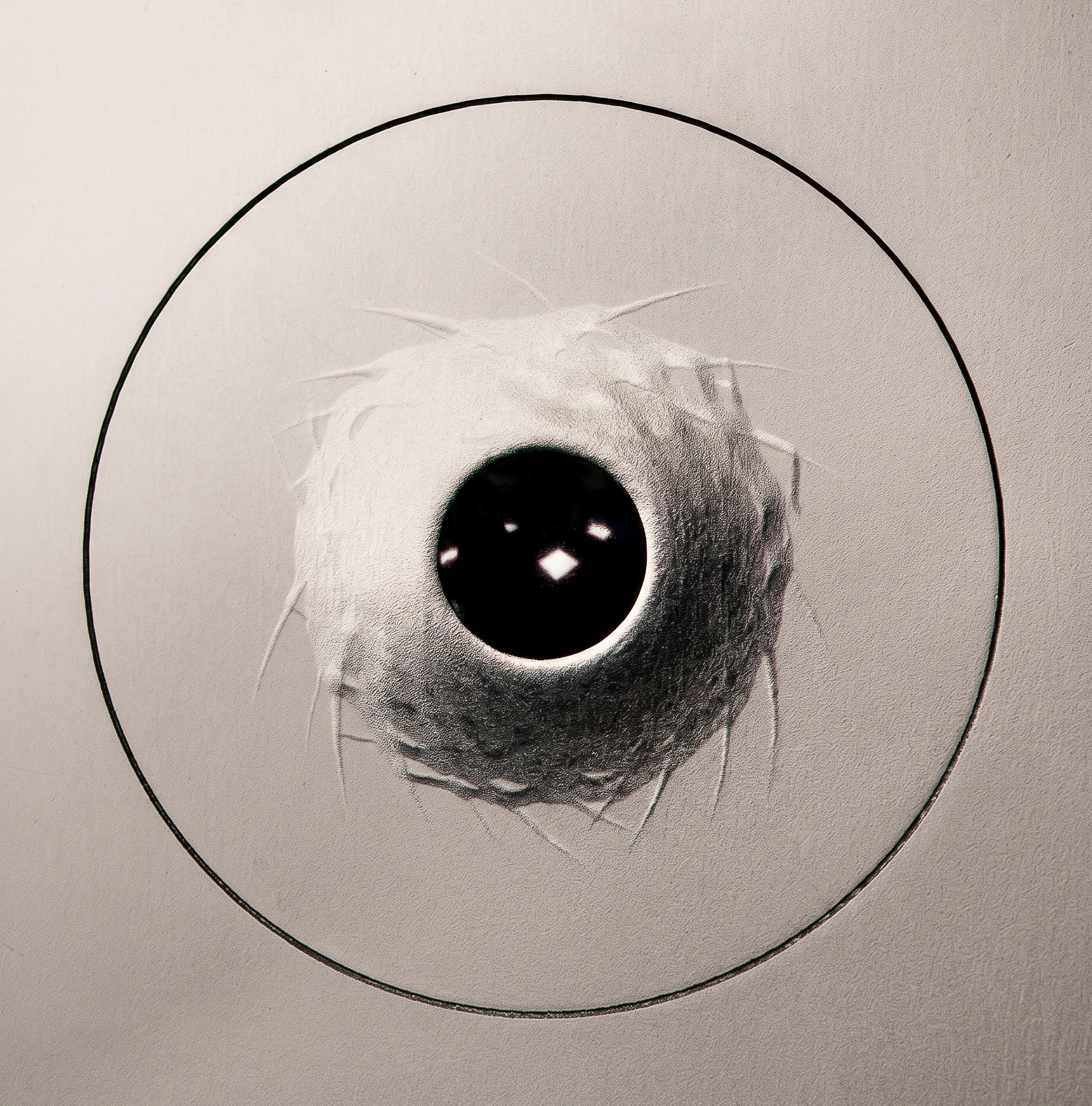
An indentation in steel caused by a tungsten carbide sphere under 29,420 Newton load, showing the pile up around the indentation consisting of displaced material that has been forced sideways

The advantage of the Brinell test over other measurement systems is that the indentation diameters usually range between 2.4mm and 6mm. This means that the indentation is unaffected by the grain structure of the metal under test, so Brinell testing is especially useful in testing materials such as rough castings with coarse grains. However, measurement of the indentation is normally carried out by a technician using a low-powered microscope, a method susceptible to error as it can be difficult to judge exactly where an indentation begins and ends and to align the apparent edge points precisely under a microscope's graticule. The difficulty in determining the edge arises because the indenter pushes material laterally, creating a 'lip' or 'piling up' of material at the indentation boundary (in annealed metals the opposite phenomenon occurs: 'sinking in' so that material at the indentation edge is left at a lower level than material a greater distance from the indentation). Three experienced technicians could obtain three slightly different readings using the same microscope - and an error of 0.2mm can equal 20 hardness points. An example of this pile up is pictured. The image also shows the surface lines caused by discontinuous yielding.

== Technical developments ==
The automation of Brinell hardness measurement emerged during the late twentieth century as part of a broader effort within industrial metrology to improve measurement repeatability and reduce operator-dependent variation in hardness testing. Herrmann, K. (2011). Hardness Testing: Principles and Applications. ASM International. ISBN 978-1-61503-832-9. In the early 1980s a collaboration between the British metrological research and manufacturing company Foundrax Engineering Products and the University of Birmingham resulted in the development of a system consisting of an optical microscope connected to a dedicated computer which was able to measure indentations across multiple axes and calculate a mean value in under a second. Operator involvement was limited to positioning the microscope over the indentation. Automatic measurement systems are now used in many production environments where accuracy is critical.

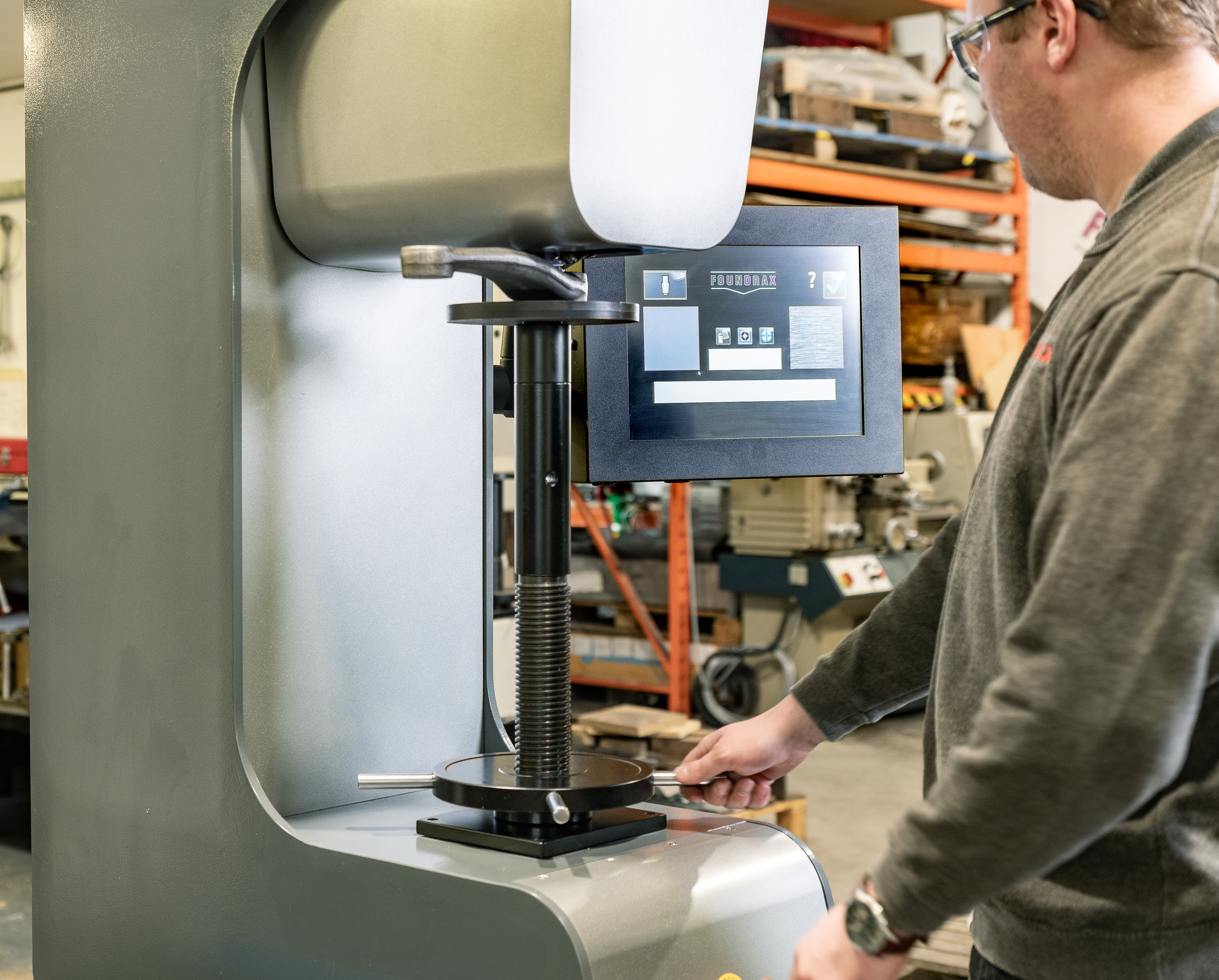
A motor vehicle suspension component being tested on a Brinell hardness testing machine

== Technical details ==
Brinell hardness is sometimes quoted in megapascals; the Brinell hardness value (expressed as HBW (see above)) is multiplied by the acceleration due to gravity, 9.80665 m/s^{2}, to convert it to megapascals.

The Brinell hardness value can be correlated with the ultimate tensile strength (UTS), although the relationship is dependent on the material, and therefore determined empirically. The relationship is based on Meyer's index (n) from Meyer's law. If Meyer's index is less than 2.2 then the ratio of UTS to HBW is 0.36. If Meyer's index is greater than 2.2, then the ratio increases.

The Brinell hardness is designated by the most commonly used test standards (ASTM E10-14 and ISO 6506–1:2005) as HBW (H from hardness, B from brinell and W from the material of the indenter, tungsten (wolfram) carbide). In former standards HB or HBS were used to refer to measurements made with steel indenters.

HBW is calculated in both standards using the SI units as

$$\operatorname{HBW}=0.102 \frac{2F}{\pi D \left(D-\sqrt{D^2-d^2}\right)}$$

where:

F = applied load (newtons)
D = diameter of indenter (mm)
d = diameter of indentation (mm)

== Common values ==
When quoting a Brinell hardness value (HBW), the conditions of the test used to obtain the number must be specified. The standard format for specifying tests can be seen in the example "HBW 10/3000". The "10" is the ball diameter in millimeters. The "3000" is the load expressed as kilograms force (29,820 Newtons).

The hardness may also be shown as XXX HB YYD^{2}. The XXX is the force to apply (in kgf) on a material of type YY (5 for aluminum alloys, 10 for copper alloys, 30 for steels). Thus a typical steel hardness could be written: 250 HB 30D^{2}. It could be a maximum or a minimum.

Correspondent relations among scale, indenter and test force:
Hardness symbol	Diameter of Indenter mm	F/D2	Test force N/kgf
HBW 10/3000	10	30	29420(3000)
HBW 10/1500	10	15	14710(1500)
HBW 10/1000	10	10	9807(1000)

Brinell hardness numbers
Material	Hardness
Softwood (e.g., pine)	1.6 HBS 10/100
Hardwood	2.6–7.0 HBS 10/100
Lead	5.0 HB (pure lead; alloyed lead typically can range from 5.0 HB to values in excess of 22.0 HB)
Pure Aluminium	15 HB
Copper	35 HB
Hardened AW-6060 Aluminium	75 HB
Mild steel	120 HB
18–8 (304) stainless steel annealed	200 HB
Quenched and tempered steel wear plate	400-700 HB
Hardened tool steel	600–900 HB (HBW 10/3000)
Glass	1550 HB
Rhenium diboride	4600 HB
Note: Standard test conditions unless otherwise stated

== Standards ==
- International (ISO) and European (CEN) Standard
  - "EN ISO 6506-1:2014: Metallic materials – Brinell hardness test – Part 1: test method".
  - "EN ISO 6506-2:2017: Metallic materials – Brinell hardness test – Part 2: verification and calibration of testing machine".
  - "EN ISO 6506-3:2014: Metallic materials – Brinell hardness test – Part 3: calibration of reference blocks".
  - "EN ISO 6506-4:2014: Metallic materials – Brinell hardness test – Part 4: Table of hardness values".
- US standard (ASTM International)
  - "ASTM E10-23: Standard Test Method for Brinell Hardness of Metallic Materials".

== See also ==
- Brinelling
- Hardness comparison
- Knoop hardness test
- Leeb rebound hardness test
- Rockwell hardness test
- Vickers hardness test
- Janka hardness test
