= Knoop hardness test =

Test for mechanical hardness

Angles of a Knoop hardness test indenter

The Knoop hardness test /kəˈnuːp/ is a microhardness test – a test for mechanical hardness used particularly for very brittle materials or thin sheets, where only a small indentation may be made for testing purposes. A pyramidal diamond point is pressed into the polished surface of the test material with a known (often 100 g) load, for a specified dwell time, and the resulting indentation is measured using a microscope. The geometry of this indenter is an extended pyramid with the length to width ratio being 7:1 and respective face angles are 172 degrees for the long edge and 130 degrees for the short edge. The depth of the indentation can be approximated as 1/30 of the long dimension. The Knoop hardness HK or KHN is then given by the formula:

Comparison between the Mohs and the Knoop scales

$$HK={{\text{load}(\mathrm{kgf})} \over {\text{impression area} (\mathrm{mm}^2)}}={P \over {C_\text{p}L^2}}$$

where:

L is the length of indentation along its long axis
C_{p} is the correction factor related to the shape of the indenter, ideally 0.070279
P is the load

HK values are typically in the range from 100 to 1000, when specified in the conventional units of kg_{f}⋅mm^{−2}. The SI unit, pascal, is sometimes used instead: 1 kg_{f}⋅mm^{−2} = 9.80665 MPa. The impression area represents a projected area based on the surface projection of the elongated diagonal measurement. This is different from the area term used for other types of indentation hardness testing, such as the Vickers hardness test, which utilize a contact surface area term.

Sample values
Material	HK
Dentin	68
Gold foil	69
Tooth enamel	343
Quartz	820
Silicon carbide	2480
Diamond	7000

The test was developed by Frederick Knoop and colleagues at the National Bureau of Standards (now NIST) of the United States in 1939, and is defined by the ASTM E384 standard.

The advantages of the test are that only a very small sample of material is required, and that it is valid for a wide range of test forces. The main disadvantages are the difficulty of using a microscope to measure the indentation (with an accuracy of 0.5 micrometre), and the time needed to prepare the sample and apply the indenter.

Variables such as load, temperature, and environment, may affect this procedure, which have been examined in detail.

== See also ==
- Vickers hardness test
- Knoop hardness of ceramics
- Leeb rebound hardness test
- Meyer hardness test
