= Bessemer Gold Medal =

Annual award in the steel industry

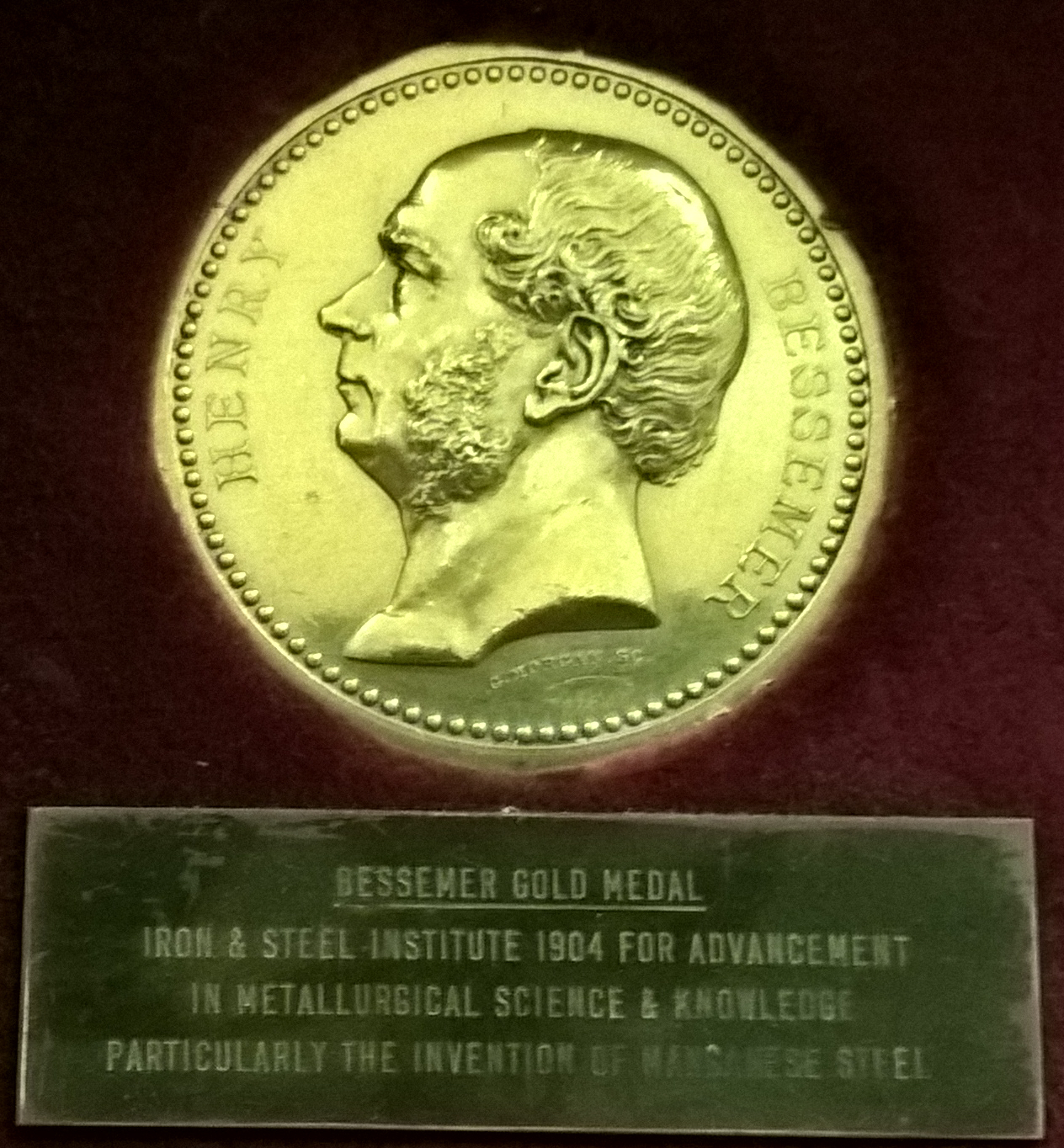
Bessemer Gold Medal awarded 1904 to Robert Hadfield

The Bessemer Gold Medal is awarded annually by the Institute of Materials, Minerals and Mining (IOM3) "for outstanding services to the steel industry, to the inventor or designer of any significant innovation in the process employed in the manufacture of steel, or for innovation in the use of steel in the manufacturing industry or the economy generally". The recipient is expected to prepare and deliver the Bessemer Lecture.

It was established and endowed to the Iron and Steel Institute in 1874 by Sir Henry Bessemer and was first awarded to Isaac Lowthian Bell in 1874. The Iron and Steel Institute merged in 1974 into the Institute of Metals, which in 1993 became part of the Institute of Materials, which in turn became part of the IOM3 in 2002.

== Prizewinners ==
Source: IOM3 archive website and current IOM3 website

=== IOM3 ===
- 2025 Mark D Millett
- 2024 William Mark Rainforth
- 2023 Geoffrey Brooks
- 2022 Robertus Boom
- 2021 John J Feriolla
- 2020 David Anthony Worsley
- 2019 J Bolton
- 2018 I Samarasekera
- 2017 J Speer
- 2016 A W Cramb
- 2015 John Beynon
- 2014 H Tomono
- 2013 Prince Philip, Duke of Edinburgh
- 2013 K Mills
- 2012 G Honeyman
- 2011 I Christmas
- 2010 M Sellars
- 2009 G Arvedi
- 2008 T Mukherjee
- 2007 L Mittal
- 2006 H Bhadeshia
- 2005 S I Pettifor
- 2004 R J Fruehan
- 2003 J P Birat
- 2002 R E Dolby

=== Institute of Materials ===
- 2001 M J Pettifor
- 2000 Terry Gladman
- 1999 Etham T Turkdogan
- 1998 R Baker
- 1997 F Kenneth Iverson
- 1996 Sir Brian Moffat
- 1995 P Wright
- 1994 F B Pickering
- 1993 H Saito

=== Institute of Metals ===
- 1992 C E H Morris
- 1991 Frank Fitzgerald
- 1990 J S Pennington
- 1989 Gerald R Heffernan
- 1988 Sir R Scholey
- 1987 Tae-Joon Park
- 1986 J.R.D. Tata
- 1985 Viscount E Davignon

=== Metals Society ===
- 1984 P Metz
- 1983 I K MacGregor
- 1982 Godefridus Wilhelmus van Stein Callenfels
- 1981 Sir I McLennan
- 1980 M Tenenbaum
- 1979 H O H Haavisto
- 1978 Karl Brotzmann
- 1977 H Morrogh
- 1976 J D Joy
- 1975 Richard Weck
- 1974 Sir M Finniston

=== Iron and Steel Institute ===
- 1973 J W Menter
- 1972 M Morgan
- 1971 A G Quarrell
- 1970 P Coheur
- 1969 Queen Elizabeth II
- 1968 F D Richardson
- 1967 E T Judge
- 1966 John Hugh Chesters
- 1965 T Sendzimir
- 1965 N P Allen
- 1964 H Malcor
- 1963 F H Saniter
- 1962 Sir Charles Goodeve
- 1961 W Barr
- 1960 Hermann Schenck
- 1959 B M S Kalling
- 1958 W F Cartwright
- 1957 R Durrer
- 1956 C Sykes
- 1955 John Chipman
- 1954 T P Colclough
- 1953 R Mather
- 1952 H H Burton
- 1951 B F Fairless
- 1950 J Mitchell
- 1948 W J Dawson
- 1947 K M Tigerchiold
- 1947 Sir William J Larke
- 1946 J S Hollings
- 1945 Harold Wright
- 1944 E Lewis
- 1943 J H Whiteley
- 1942 E G Grace
- 1941 T Swinden
- 1940 Sir Andrew McCance
- 1939 J Henderson
- 1938 C H Desch
- 1937 Colonel N. T. Belaiew
- 1937 A Mayer
- 1936 Fred Clements
- 1935 A M Portevin
- 1934 King George V
- 1933 W H Hatfield
- 1932 H Louis
- 1931 Sir Harold Carpenter
- 1930 W Rosenhain
- 1930 E Schneider
- 1929 Sir Charles A Parsons
- 1928 C M Schwab
- 1927 Axel Wahlberg
- 1926 Sir Hugh Bell
- 1925 T Turner
- 1924 A Sauveur
- 1923 W H Maw
- 1922 K Honda
- 1921 C Freemont
- 1920 H Brearley
- 1919 Federico Giolitti
- 1918 The Rt Hon Lord Invernairn of Strathnairn
- 1917 A Lamberton
- 1916 F W Harbord
- 1915 P Martin
- 1914 Edward Riley
- 1913 A Greiner
- 1912 J H Darby
- 1911 H L Le Chatelier
- 1910 E H Saniter
- 1909 A Pourcel
- 1908 B Talbot
- 1907 J A Brinell
- 1906 F Osmond
- 1906 King Edward VII
- 1905 J O Arnold
- 1904 A Carnegie
- 1904 Sir R Hadfield
- 1903 The Rt Hon Lord Airedale of Gledhow
- 1902 F A Krupp
- 1901 J E Stead
- 1900 Henri de Wendel
- 1899 H M Queen Victoria
- 1898 R Prince-Williams
- 1897 Sir Frederick Abel
- 1896 H Wedding
- 1895 H M Howe
- 1894 John Gjers
- 1893 J Fritz
- 1892 A Cooper
- 1891 The Rt Hon Lord Armstrong
- 1890 W D Allen
- 1890 Hon A S Hewitt
- 1889 J D Ellis
- 1889 H Schneider
- 1888 D Adamson
- 1887 James Riley
- 1886 Edward Williams
- 1885 R Akerman
- 1884 E P Martin
- 1884 E W Richards
- 1883 G J Snelus
- 1883 Sidney Gilchrist Thomas
- 1882 A L Holley
- 1881 W Menelaus
- 1880 Sir J Whitworth
- 1879 P Cooper
- 1878 P R von Tunner
- 1877 J Percy
- 1876 R F Mushet
- 1875 Sir C W Siemens
- 1874 Sir Lowthian Bell

== See also ==
- List of engineering awards
