= Kenneth Mills =

Kenneth Mills may refer to:

- Kenneth G. Mills, Canadian metaphysical/philosophical speaker and author
- Kenneth Mills (historian), Canadian-born historian of the early modern Spanish world
- Ken Mills, British materials scientist
