= Edward Pritchard Martin =

British steelmaker and businessman

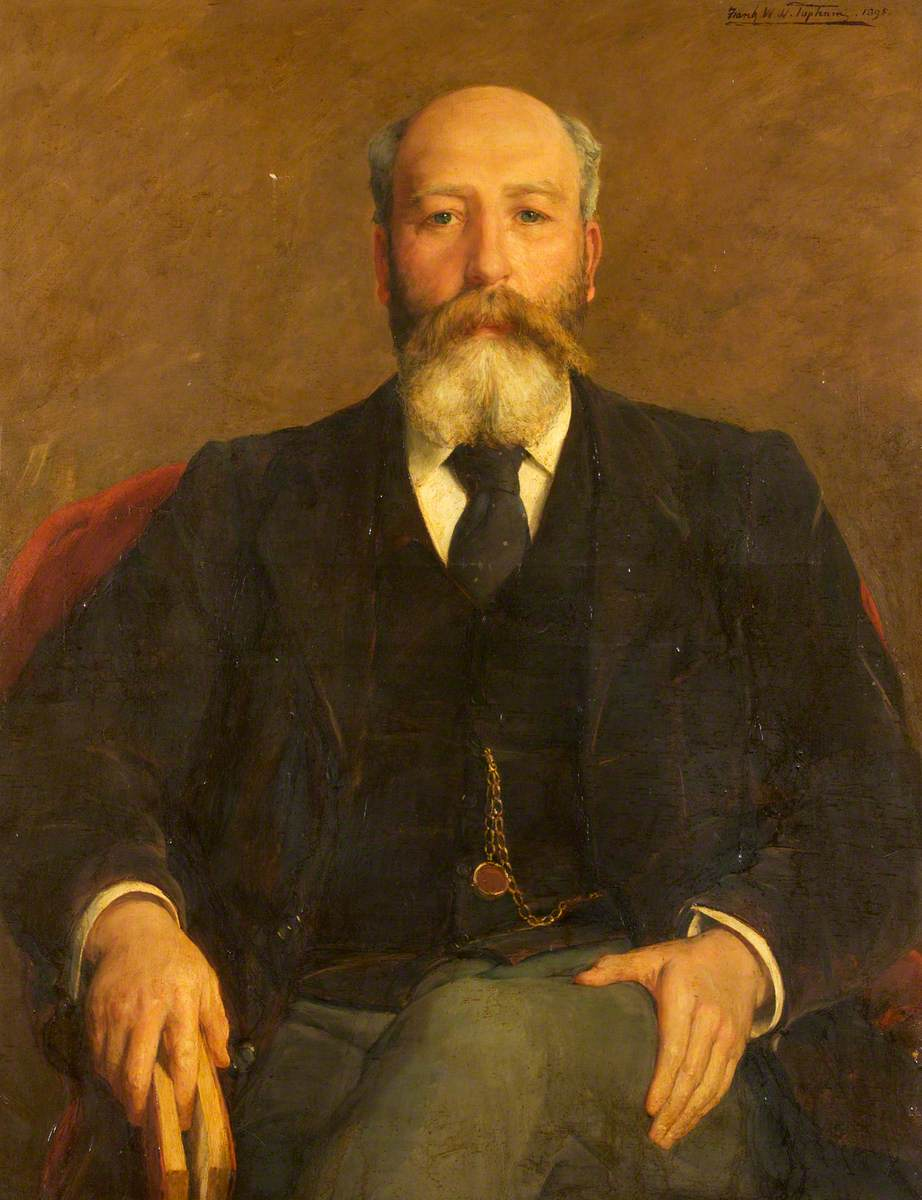
- Portrait of Martin by Frank William Warwick Topham
- Born: 20 January 1844; Dowlais, Wales, United Kingdom
- Died: 25 September 1910 (aged 66); Harrogate, United Kingdom
- Occupations: Engineer, businessman and steel maker

Edward Pritchard Martin (20 January 1844 Dowlais - 25 September 1910 Harrogate) was a British engineer, and steel maker.

== Life ==
His father was mining engineer to the Dowlais Iron Co. for 58 years. In 1860, he apprenticed with William Menelaus, who had worked with Sir Henry Bessemer. In 1864, he worked at the London office of the Dowlais Iron Co. In 1869, he was deputy general manager of the Dowlais Ironworks under Menelaus. At the end of 1870, he became manager of the Cwmavon Works.

Later he worked at the Blaenavon Ironworks. He became associated with the Thomas-Gilchrist attempts to make a satisfactory metal from phosphoric ores. He made commercial trials of the process. He was awarded the Bessemer Gold Medal, by the Iron and Steel Institute in 1884, with Edward Windsor Richards.

After the death of Menelaus, he became General Manager of the Dowlais Iron Works, from 1882 to 1902. He supervised the erection of new works at East Moors Steelworks, Cardiff beginning in 1888; blast furnaces were blown in February 1891, and the works and steel mill started production in 1895.

== Other positions ==
He was elected President of the Institution of Mechanical Engineers in both 1905 and 1906. and of the Iron and Steel Institute in 1897–98. He was also President of the South Wales Institute of Engineers and the Monmouth and South Wales Colliery-Owners’ Association.

He served as High Sheriff of Monmouthshire in 1903.

Professional and academic associations
| Preceded by Joseph Hartley Wicksteed | President of the Institution of Mechanical Engineers; 1905-1906 | Succeeded by Tom Hurry Riches |
