= George James Snelus =

English metallurgist

- Born: 24 June 1837; Camden Town, London
- Died: 18 June 1906 (aged 68); Frizington, Cumberland
- Education: Royal School of Mines
- Known for: Use of lime for dephosphorization of pig iron.
- Awards: Bessemer Gold Medal (1883)
- Scientific career
- Fields: Metallurgist
- Workplaces: Dowlais Iron Works

George James Snelus FRS (25 June 1837 - 1906) was an English metallurgist, known to be the first to remove phosphorus from pig iron, by oxidizing it in a converter lined with basic refractory materials. Facing difficulties to perform a reliable and cheap lining, he delayed further improvements and failed to find a practical solution, which was finally found by Sidney Gilchrist Thomas.

Snelus was born in Camden Town, London and educated at St John's College, Battersea. He attended lectures at Owen's College, Manchester and in 1864 was awarded a scholarship to the Royal School of Mines. He was recommended by his lecturer there to William Menelaus at the Dowlais Iron Works as a suitable candidate for the position of works chemist, a position he held for 5 years.

In 1871 he was commissioned by the Iron and Steel Institute to visit America and investigate a new process, the Danks system of puddling. Whilst researching the process he discovered that phosphorus could be removed from molten iron by using lime as a furnace liner, a discovery he patented. The process was later developed for practical use by Sidney Gilchrist Thomas and Percy C. Gilchrist.

Snelus was awarded the 1883 Bessemer Gold Medal of the Iron and Steel Institute jointly with Thomas for their work on dephosphorization and Snelus also shared the financial benefits of the basic process patents with both the other researchers. He was elected a Fellow of the Royal Society in 1887 and was awarded gold medals at both the Inventions Exhibition in 1885 and the Paris Exhibition of 1889 for his discoveries.

He died in Frizington, Cumberland in 1906. He had married Lavinia Whitfield, daughter of David Woodward, silk manufacturer of Macclesfield.
