= John Stead =

John Stead may refer to:

- John Stead (mayor) (1854–1922), Scottish-born New Zealand politician, father of Billy Stead
- Billy Stead (John William Stead, 1877–1958), rugby union player
- John Stead (bishop), Anglican bishop of Willochra
- John Edward Stead (1851–1923), British metallurgist

== See also ==
- Jon Stead (born 1983), English footballer
