= Johan August Brinell =

Swedish metallurgist (1849–1925)

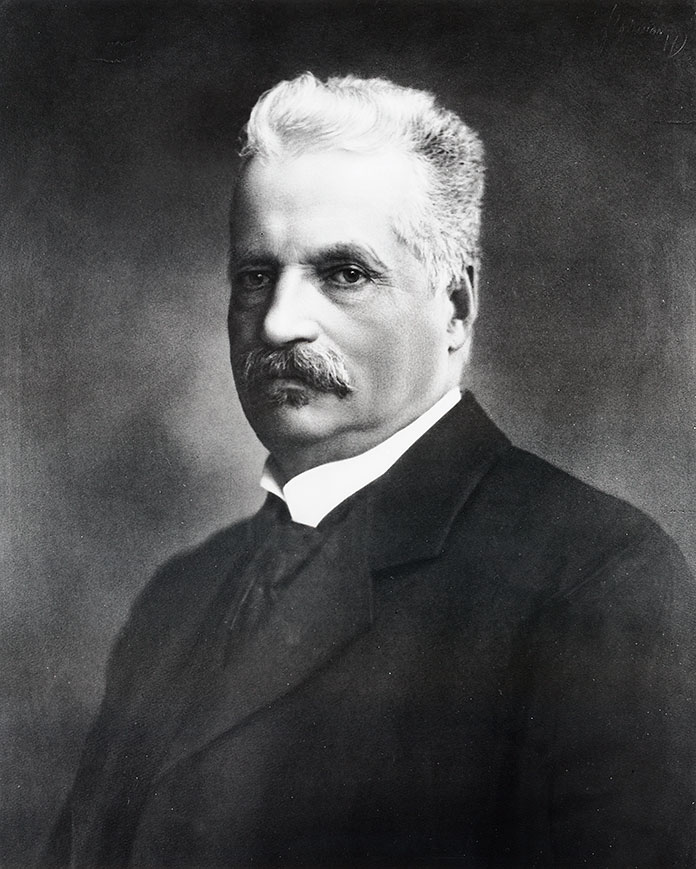
Brinell in 1920

August Brinell (10 October 1849 – 17 November 1925) was a Swedish metallurgical engineer.

Brinell is noted as the creator of a method for quantifying the surface hardness of materials, now known as the Brinell hardness test. His name is also commemorated in the description of a failure mechanism of material surfaces known as Brinelling.

== Biography ==
Brinell was born in Bringetofta, Nässjö Kommun, Sweden. He began his career as an Engineer at the Lesjöfors Ironworks and in 1882 became chief engineer at the Fagersta Ironworks. In 1903 he became Chief Engineer at Jernkontoret, the Swedish Ironmasters' Association. He remained at that post until 1914.

Brinell was elected a member of the Royal Swedish Academy of Sciences in 1902, and of the Royal Swedish Academy of Engineering Sciences in 1919. He was awarded the Bessemer Gold Medal of the Iron and Steel Institute in 1907.

He died of pneumonia in 1925 in Stockholm.

== Legacy ==
Brinell is best known today for the Brinell hardness test, which he proposed in 1900. In this test a 10-millimetre (most commonly) diameter tungsten carbide ball is pushed into the surface of the material being tested, by a 3,000 kgf load. Although the 10mm indenter ball and 3,000 kgf is the most frequent diameter and load combination used in Brinell testing, the test actually allows the utilisation of a wide range of loads and indenter diameters to maximise its applicability. The diameter of the resulting indentation is directly related to the hardness of the metal (the wider the indentation the softer the material) and by means of the Brinell equation a hardness value expressed as numerals followed by HBW for Hardness Brinell Wolfram (Wolfram being an alternative name for tungsten carbide)) is arrived at:

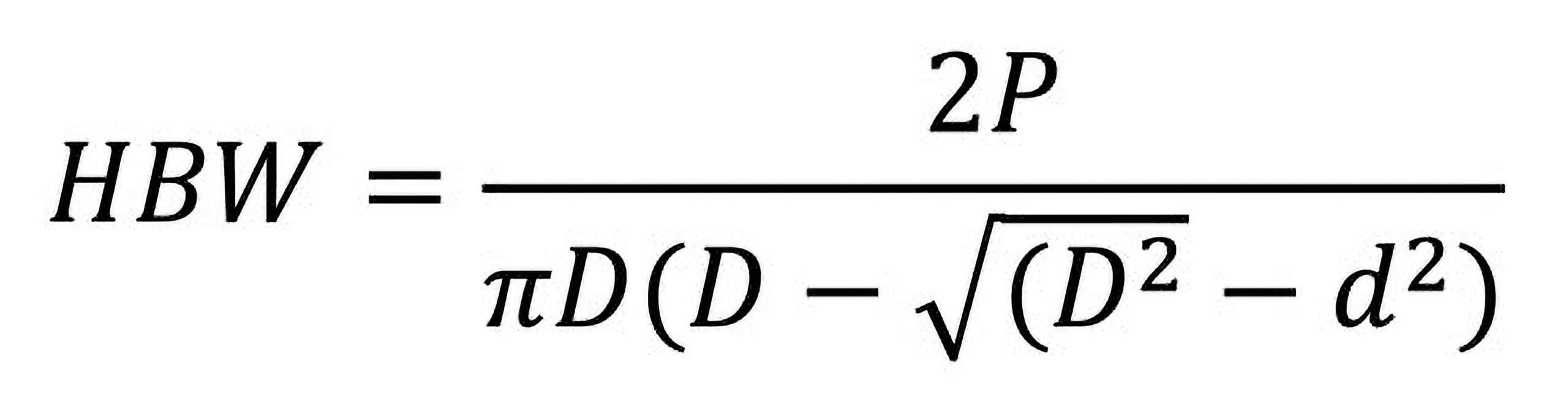
The Brinell equation, used to calculate the hardness of materials (most commonly metals)

In this equation ‘P’ is the applied load, typically measured in kilograms-force (kgf). ‘D’ is the diameter of the indenter ball in millimeters (mm) and ‘d’ is the diameter of the resulting indentation in millimeters (mm).

It is a rapid, non-destructive (except at the surface being tested) means of determining the hardness of metals. His test remains in wide use today as it is the best for determining the macro-hardness of materials with coarse grain structures such as castings and forgings. This is because the relatively large indentations, typically 2.4 mm to 6 mm in diameter, are unaffected by the grain structure of the material under test. Brinell testers are therefore found in forges and foundries all over the World.

Brinell testing requires that indentation diameters be measured with a low powered microscope, so it is susceptible to errors by workshop technicians who must exercise their judgement as to where the edges of the indentation are (the test requires the measurement of diameters across x and y axes and the calculation of the mean) but a collaboration in the early 1980s between the University of Birmingham (United Kingdom) and the British metrological research and manufacturing company Foundrax Engineering Products, produced an automatic microscope which overcame this weakness.
