= John Fritz =

American engineer (1821–1913)

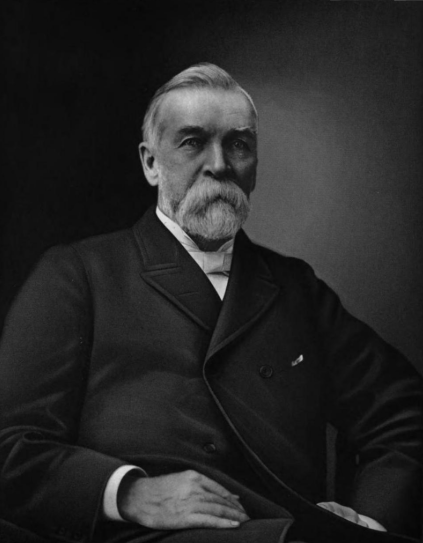
- Born: John F. Fritz; August 21, 1822; Londonberry Township, Pennsylvania, U.S.
- Died: February 13, 1913 (aged 90); Bethlehem, Pennsylvania, U.S.
- Awards: John Fritz Gold Medal; Bessemer Gold Medal; Elliott Cresson Gold Medal

John F. Fritz (August 21, 1822 – February 13, 1913) was an American pioneer of iron and steel technology who has been referred to as the "Father of the U.S. Steel Industry". To celebrate his 80th birthday the John Fritz Medal was established in 1902, with Fritz himself being the first recipient.

== Early life and education ==
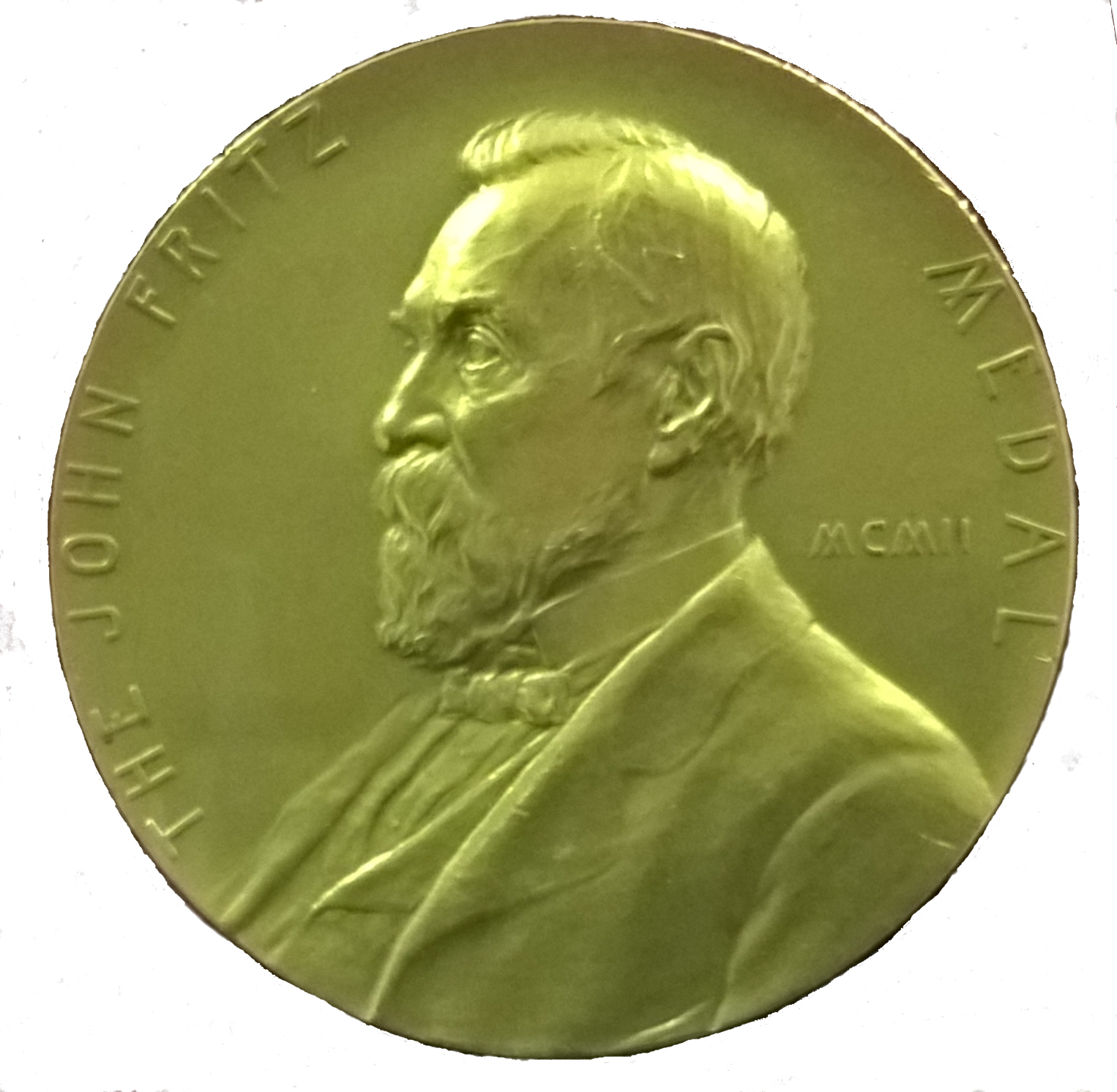
John Fritz Gold Medal 1921

Fritz was born August 21, 1822, in Londonderry Township, Chester County, Pennsylvania, the eldest of seven children of George Fritz and Mary Meharg. He was of German and Scotch-Irish descent.

== Career ==
At the age of 16, Fritz was awarded an apprentiship as a blacksmith. He progressed to become a mechanic, working for the Norristown Iron Company. In 1854, he moved to the Cambria Iron Company, where he designed the first three-high rolling mill, a notable achievement. In 1860 he became General Superintendent and Chief Engineer of the Bethlehem Iron Works in Bethlehem, Pennsylvania. While there he was responsible for installing a Bessemer Converter and various developments in the company, staying until 1892, when he was 70.

Fritz was president and an honorary member of the American Society of Mechanical Engineers, president of the American Institute of Mining Engineers, honorary vice president for life of the Iron and Steel Institute of London, member of the American Society of Civil Engineers, honorary member of the American Iron and Steel Institute, and recipient of the Bessemer Gold Medal, the Elliott Cresson Gold Medal, and the John Fritz Gold Medal of the United Engineering Societies. He was awarded honorary degrees from Columbia University, the University of Pennsylvania, Temple University and the Stevens Institute of Technology.

== Death ==
Fritz died at his home in Bethlehem on February 13, 1913, at age 90

== Selected publications ==
- John Fritz, The Autobiography of John Fritz (New York: John Wiley & Sons, 1912). Available online through Beyond Steel: An Archive of Lehigh Valley Industry and Culture.

About John Fritz

- Lance Metz, John Fritz: His Role in the Development of the American Iron and Steel Industry and His Legacy to the Bethlehem Community (Easton, PA: Center for Canal History and Technology, 1987).
