= Albert Sauveur =

Belgian-American metallurgist (1863–1939)

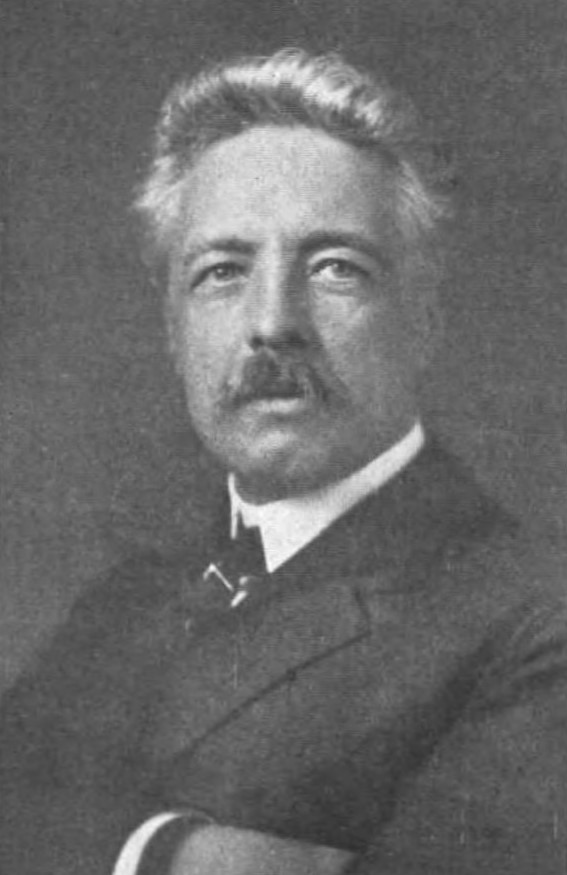
- Born: 21 June 1863; Leuven, Belgium
- Died: 26 January 1939 (aged 75); Boston, Massachusetts
- Occupation: Metallurgy
- Awards: Elliott Cresson Medal (1913); Franklin Medal (1939)

Albert Sauveur (French pronunciation: [albɛʁ sovœʁ]; 21 June 1863 – 26 January 1939) was a Belgian-born American metallurgist. He founded the first metallographic laboratory in a university.

Sauveur was born in Leuven, Belgium. He studied at the Athénée Royal in Brussels, then the School of Mines, Liège and graduated at the Massachusetts Institute of Technology in 1889. He remained in the United States thereafter, becoming a Professor of Metallurgy in 1905.

After several years working in industry, where he pioneered the use of microscopes to study the internal structure of steel, Sauveur joined Harvard University as a Instructor in Metallurgy, becoming Professor of Metallurgy in 1905. From 1924 to 1939, he held the Gordon McKay Professor of Mining and Metallurgy title at the university. From 1939 on, ASM International started bestowing the Albert Sauveur Achievement Award, for achievements in materials science and engineering.

He was a member of the US National Academy of Sciences, the American Academy of Arts and Sciences, the American Philosophical Society and the Iron and Steel Institute of Great Britain, the Iron and Steel Institute of America. He was awarded the Elliott Cresson Medal in 1913 and the Franklin Medal in 1939, both from The Franklin Institute and the Bessemer Gold Medal of the British Iron and Steel Institute in 1924.

He died in Boston, Massachusetts in 1939, survived by his wife and 2 daughters.

== Works ==
- "Microstructure of Steel" presented to the American Institute of Mining Engineers at the Engineering Congress of Chicago (1893).
- "Microstructure of Steel and the Current Theories of Hardening" Transactions of The American Institute of Mining Engineers (1896)
- "Metallographist" a quarterly publication (1898-1905)
- "Metallography and Heat Treatment of Iron and Steel" (1912)
- "Metallurgical Dialogue" copyrighted in 1935 by Albert Sauveur and published by the American Society for Metals.
- "Metallurgical Reminiscences" copyrighted in 1937 by the American Institute of Mining and Metallurgical Engineers.
- Both works were later reproduced in "Metallurgical Reminiscences And Dialogue" copyrighted in 1981 by the American Society for Metals.(Library of Congress Catalog Card no. :81-70044 ISBN 0-87170-132-4.)
