= Robert Baker (scientist) =

British metallurgist and steelmaker

- Born: 1938; Handsworth, South Yorkshire
- Died: 2004 (aged 65–66)
- Education: Woodhouse Grammar School; University of Sheffield

Robert Baker, FREng, FIMMM (1938–2004) was a British metallurgist and steelmaker.

Baker was born Handsworth, Sheffield, England, attended Woodhouse Grammar School and graduated with an honours degree in metallurgy from the University of Sheffield in 1960. He stayed on to conduct research on the use of a stabilised zirconia solid electrolyte for the measurement of oxygen activity in molten steel, for which he was awarded a PhD in 1964.

Baker worked for British Steel Corporation for many years, and was appointed Director of Research and Development in 1986 following the retirement of Dr KJ Irvine. Together with colleagues at the company, he was granted patents relating to steel production.

Baker was elected a Fellow of the Royal Academy of Engineering and a Fellow of the Institute of Materials, Minerals and Mining (IMMM). The IMMM also awarded him the Sir Robert Hadfield medal with his colleague GD Spenceley in 1987, and the Bessemer Gold Medal in 1998 for services to the industry.
