= James Menter =

British physicist (1921–2006)

Sir James Woodham Menter, FRS FRMS (22 August 1921 – 18 July 2006) was a British physicist.

He was born in Teynham, Kent and was educated at the Dover Grammar School for Boys, where he won a scholarship to study Natural Sciences at Peterhouse, Cambridge. His studies were interrupted by the Second World War, during which he was engaged on trials of Under Water Sound Detection systems at the Admiralty Research Station in Fairlie, Ayrshire. He completed his degree in 1945 and did a PhD on the subject of the use of the electron microscope to examine the micro-topography of surfaces.

In 1961 he went to work at the Tube Investments Research Laboratory at Hinxton Hall, Cambridgeshire. There he was able to acquire the latest and most powerful Electron Microscope then available, the Siemens Elmiscop 1, and soon demonstrated its potential to determine the atomic structure of crystalline solids by resolving the structure of platinum phthalocyanine. In 1965 he was appointed director of research and development at the establishment and in 1968 made a member of the main board of the company.

He was elected a Fellow of the Royal Society in 1966, becoming vice-president and treasurer of the society. He was also President of the newly renamed Institute of Physics for 1970–1972 and knighted in 1973. In 1974 he was made an Honorary Fellow of the Royal Microscopical Society.

He left TI in 1976 to become Principal of Queen Mary College, London, holding the position until 1986.

He died in Aberfeldy, Perthshire in 2006. He had married Jean Whyte-Smith and had two sons and a daughter.

== Honours and awards ==
- 1966 Fellow of the Royal Society
- 1954 Beilby Medal and Prize
- 1973 Bessemer Gold Medal of the Iron and Steel Institute
- 1973 Knighthood
- 1977 Glazebrook Medal of the Institute of Physics
