= Alexandre Pourcel =

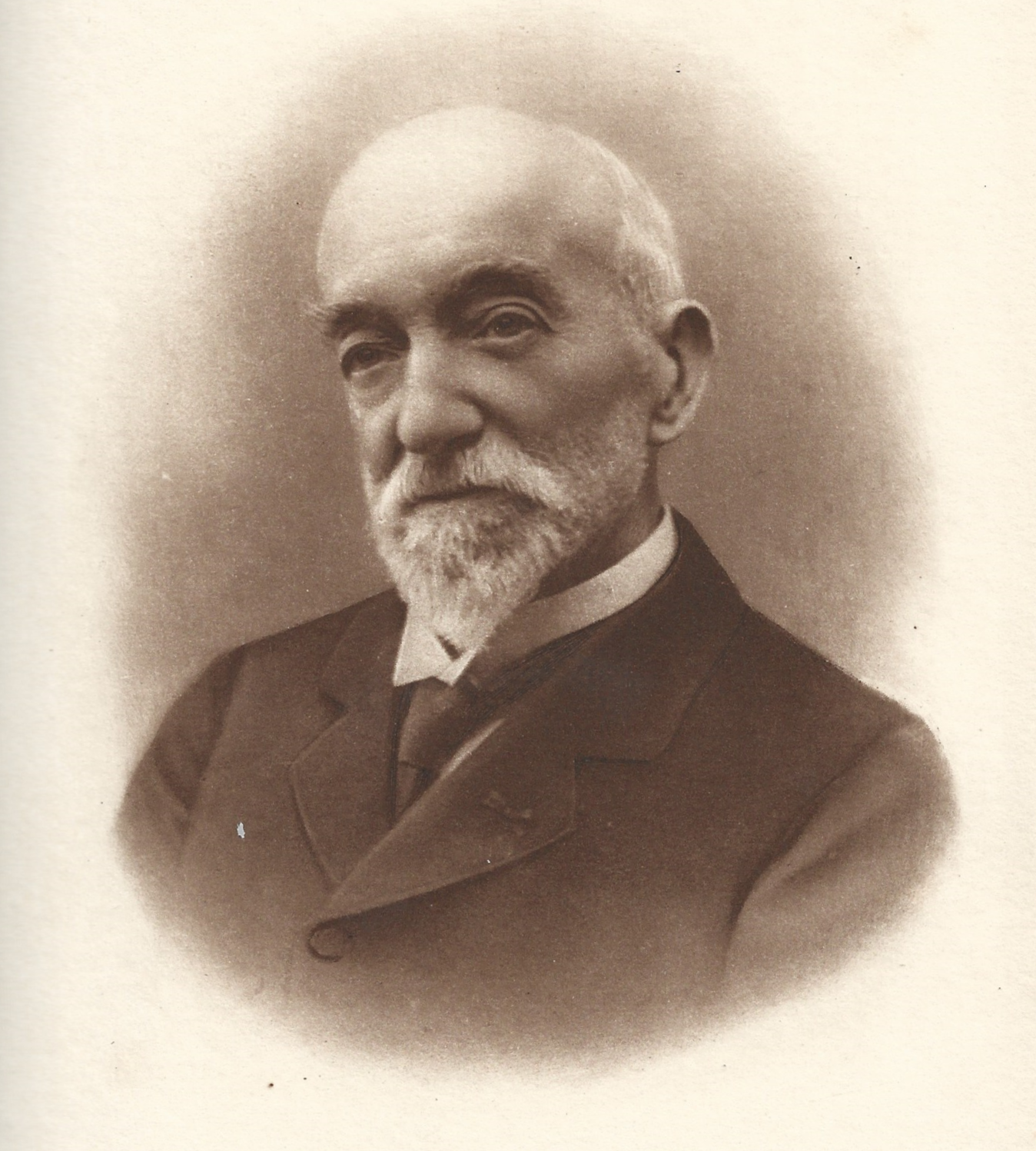
Portrait of Alexandre Pourcel

Alexandre Pourcel was a French steelmaker who won the Bessemer Gold Medal in 1909. He developed ferro-manganese and showed his work at the 1878 World's Fair, where it interested Robert Hadfield so much that he invented Mangalloy as a result.

== Life ==
Pourcel was born in Marseille in 1841.

Pourcel studied at the Ecole des Mines in St. Etienne, now École nationale supérieure des mines de Saint-Étienne.

Pourcel worked all his life at the Forges de Terrenoire or Compagnie des Fonderies et Forges de Terrenoire located in Terrenoire (now part of Saint-Étienne).

In 1909 Pourcel was awarded an Honorary Membership in the AIME.

Pourcel died in 1934.
