= Sidney Gilchrist Thomas =

British inventor (1850–1885)

- Sidney Gilchrist Thomas
- Born: 16 April 1850; Canonbury, London
- Died: 1 February 1885 (aged 34)

Sidney Gilchrist Thomas (16 April 1850 – 1 February 1885) was an English inventor, best known for his role in the iron and steel industry.

== Life ==
Thomas was born at Canonbury, London, and was educated at Dulwich College. His father, a Welshman, was in the Civil Service, and his mother was the daughter of the Rev. James Gilchrist. His father's death left the family with a considerably reduced income, so Thomas gave up his original idea of becoming a doctor and obtained an appointment as a police court clerk, which he kept until May 1879.

During these twelve years, besides the work of a busy police court, which brought him into intimate contact with social problems, he found time to study chemistry, and attended lectures at the Birkbeck Institute (which later became Birkbeck College). George Chaloner, the chemistry teacher at the Institute, remarked one evening that "the man who eliminates phosphorus by means of the Bessemer converter will make his fortune." This caught the attention of Thomas, and he set himself the task of solving the problem of eliminating phosphorus from iron produced by Bessemer converters. By the end of 1875 he was convinced that he had discovered a method. He communicated his theory to his cousin, Percy Gilchrist, who was a chemist at the former Blaenavon Ironworks, Blaenavon in Wales, and experiments were made which proved satisfactory. Edward Martin, manager of the Blaenavon Works, gave facilities for conducting the experiments on a larger scale and undertook to help in taking out a patent. In March 1878, the first public announcement of the discovery was made at the meeting of the Iron and Steel Institute; Thomas and Gilchrist took out a patent in May, but without attracting much attention. In September a paper was written by Thomas and Gilchrist on the "Elimination of Phosphorus in the Bessemer Converter" for the autumn meeting of this institute, but it was not read until May 1879. Thomas, however, made the acquaintance of Edward Windsor Richards, the manager of Bolckow Vaughan & Co's works at Cleveland, Yorkshire, whom he interested in the process, and from this time the success of the invention was assured and domestic and foreign patents were taken out.

The "basic process" invented by Thomas, also known as the Gilchrist–Thomas process, was especially valuable on the continent of Europe, where the proportion of phosphoric iron is much larger than in Britain, and both in Belgium and in Germany the name of the inventor became more widely known than in his own country. In the United States, although non-phosphoric iron largely predominated, immense interest was taken in the invention. The improved process resulted in much more slag forming in the converter. Thomas discovered that this "basic slag" could be useful and profitable as a phosphate fertiliser, known as Thomas meal.

In 1883, jointly with George James Snelus, who had previously discovered the process but had failed to develop it, he was awarded the Bessemer Gold Medal of the Iron and Steel Institute for their work on dephosphorisation.

Thomas had been overworking for years, and his lungs became affected. A long sea voyage and a residence in Egypt proved unavailing in restoring his health; he died in Paris in 1885 and was buried at Passy.

== Legacy ==
He had what William Ewart Gladstone, in a review of the Memoirs published in 1891, described as an "enthusiasm of humanity," and he left his fortune to be used for philanthropic work. A police court mission was endowed in his memory.

In July 1960 an obelisk dedicated to his memory was erected in South Wales by the Newport and District Metallurgical Society in conjunction with the Iron and Steel Institute. Financial contributions came from many sources and reflected acknowledgment of his work from the United Kingdom and other countries. The former American Society for Metals, in 1985, struck a commemorative plaque in recognition of the historical importance of the ironworks and honouring his work there. The obelisk and plaque may be seen at the ironworks.

== Gallery ==
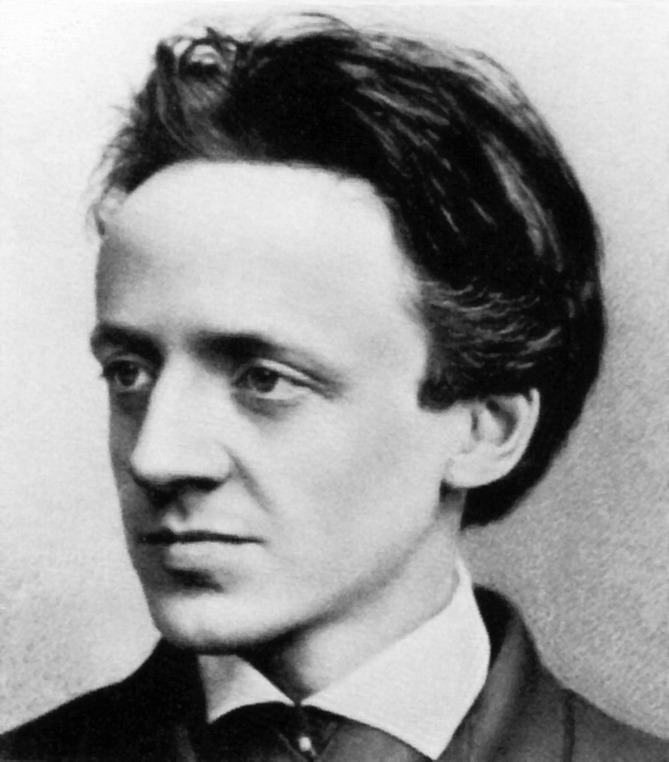

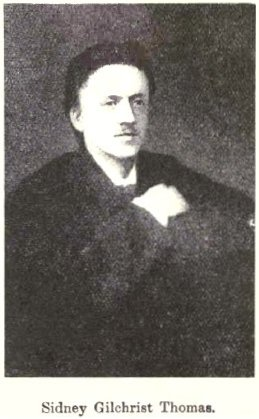

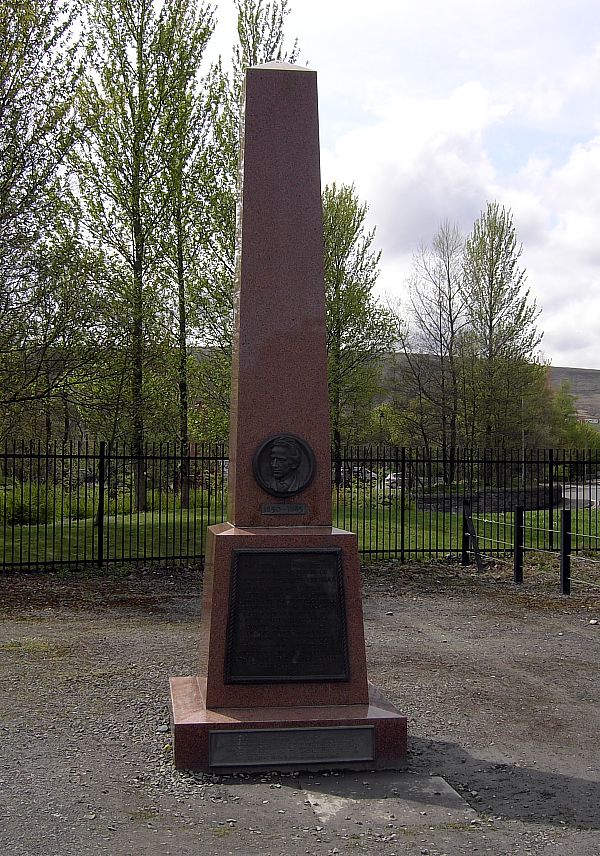

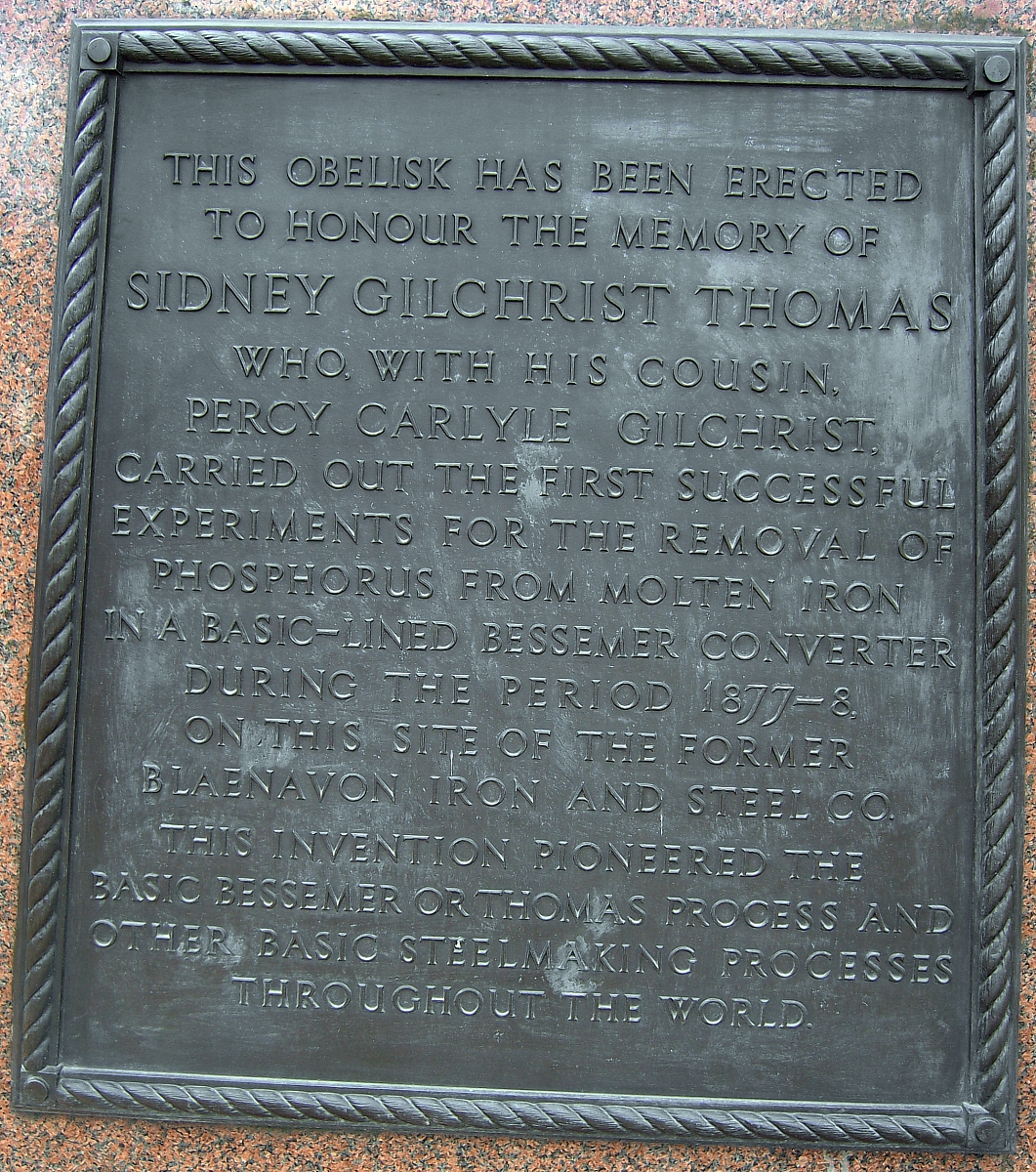

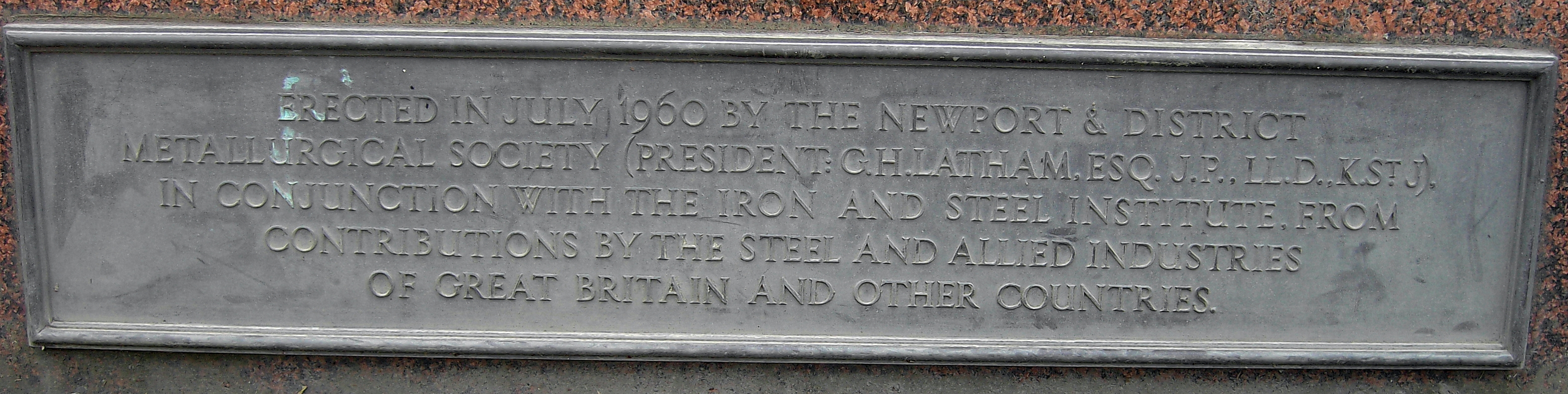

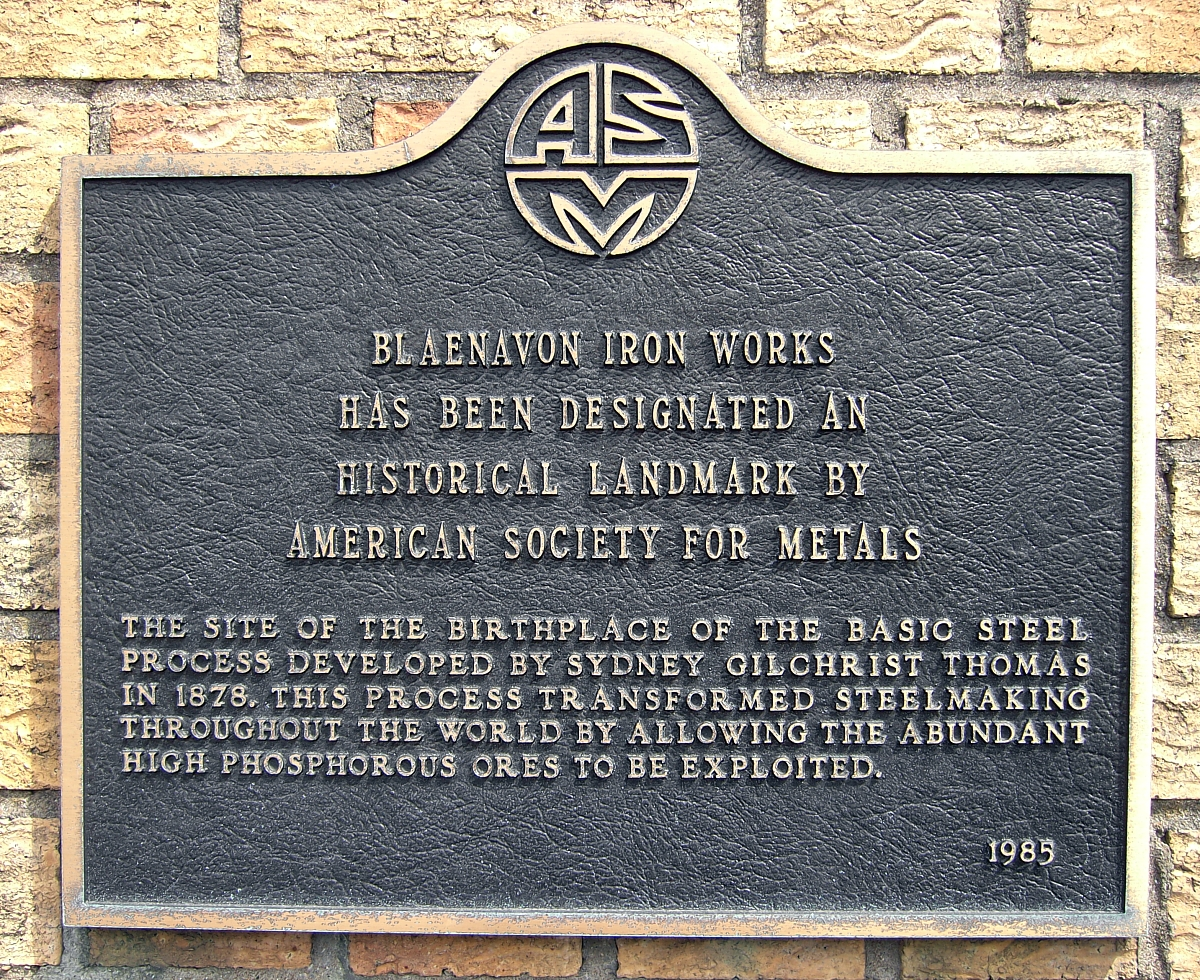
