= Frederick Brian Pickering =

English engineer and metallurgist (1927–2017)

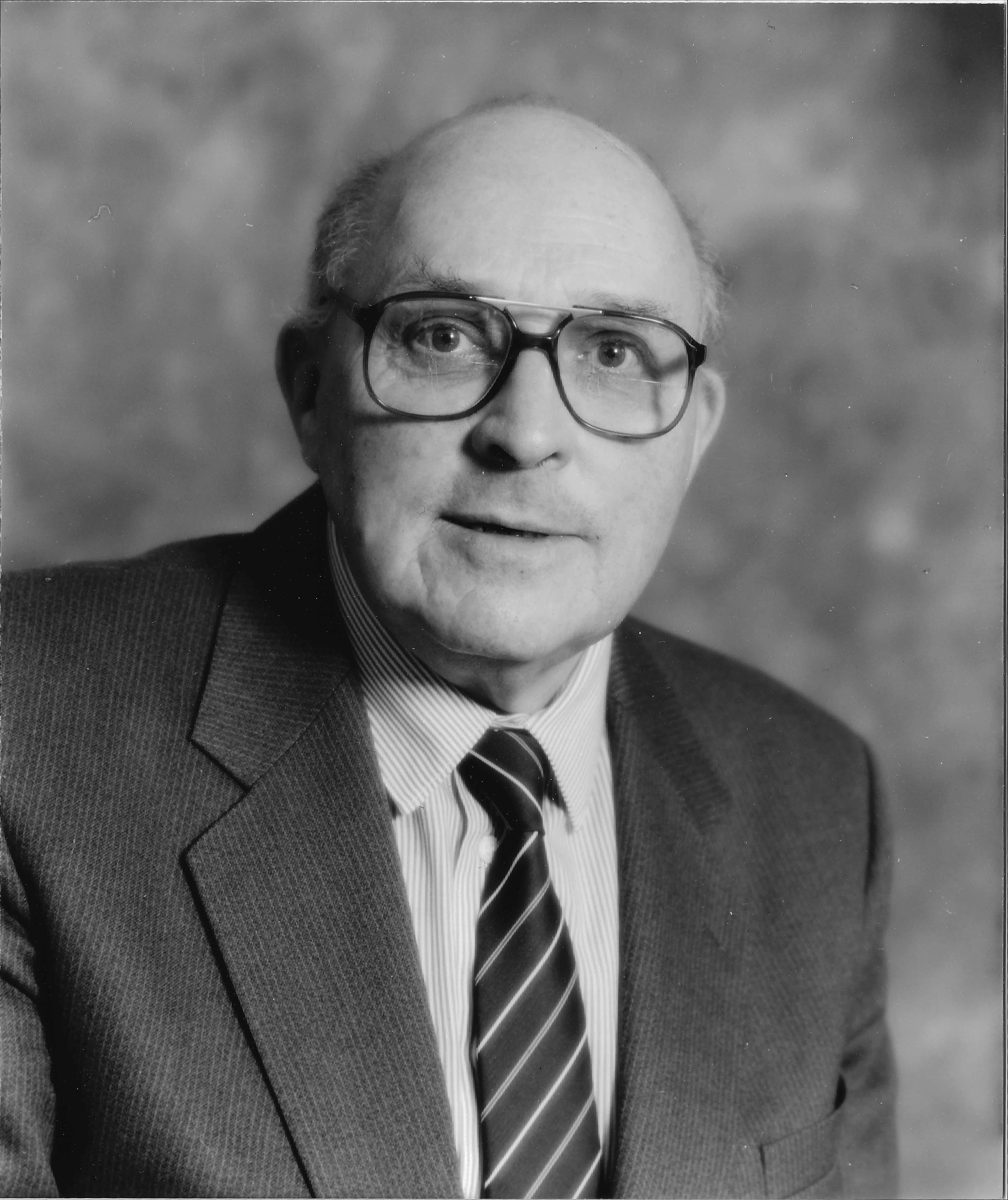
- Frederick Brian Pickering
- Born: Frederick Brian Pickering; 17 March 1927; Sheffield, West Riding of Yorkshire, England
- Died: 27 February 2017 (aged 89); Rotherham, South Yorkshire, England
- Occupation: Metallurgist
- Years active: 1960s until 1990s
- Spouse: Shirley Pickering

Frederick Brian Pickering, AMet, DMet, FIMMM, CEng, FREng (17 March 1927 - 27 February 2017) was an English metallurgist. His research and development activities contributed significantly to the creation of stronger and lighter steels.

His notable research and development throughout the 1960s, 1970s and 1980s laid the foundations for much of the physical metallurgy of high strength, low alloy steels. His Physical Metallurgy and the Design of Steels (ISBN 0-85334-752-2, originally published in 1978 by Applied Science Publishers, London), continues to be recommended reading for the majority of metallurgical engineering and materials science university courses.

He was born in Sheffield, West Riding of Yorkshire, England, in 1927, and was the cousin of footballer Jack Pickering. He joined the Central Research Department of the United Steel Companies as a junior assistant in the Physics Section in 1943 where he progressed to research assistant, senior metallographer and research supervisor, and then head of the Physical Metallurgy Section. Following the nationalisation of the steel companies in 1967, he became Assistant Research Manager and then Research Manager in Physical Metallurgy, and finally Product Metallurgy Research Manager at the Swinden Laboratories of British Steel Corporation.

In 1972 he was appointed Reader in Metallurgy at Sheffield City Polytechnic (now Sheffield Hallam University), becoming emeritus professor in 1989.

Pickering was awarded the Sidney Gilchrist Thomas Medal in 1968, and the Sir Robert Hadfield Medal in 1971, both from the Iron and Steel Institute. He was also awarded the Bessemer Gold Medal in 1994 for outstanding services to the steel industry, by the Institute of Materials, Minerals and Mining (now IOM3). He was appointed a Fellow of the Royal Academy of Engineering in 1987. He authored over 160 research publications throughout his career.

He died in 2017, survived by his wife and three children.
