= Henry Cort Harold Carpenter =

Carpenter in 1936.

Sir Henry Cort Harold Carpenter FRS (6 February 1875 – 13 September 1940) was a British metallurgist and steel specialist. He made pioneering studies on the crystallization of metals and the study of their properties.

Carpenter was born in Clifton, Bristol to William Lant Carpenter and Annie Grace Viret. His ancestors included William Benjamin Carpenter and the metallurgist Henry Cort. After the death of his father, he was taken care of by his uncle Joseph Estlin Carpenter. He studied at St. Paul's School and then at Eastbourne College. He studied chemistry at Merton College, Oxford, graduating in 1896 and then went to study organic chemistry in Leipzig, gaining a Ph.D there. He returned to assist W.H. Perkin at Owens College, Manchester.

In 1902 he joined the National Physical Laboratory and worked on chemical and metallurgical problems. Along with B.F.E. Keeling he worked on steel alloys. In 1906 he was head of metallurgy at Victoria University, Manchester. In 1914 he joined the Royal School of Mines at Imperial College, South Kensington as Professor of Metallurgy. He was President of the Iron and Steel Institute (1935–1937) and the Institution of Mining and Metallurgy.

Carpenter was elected to the membership of Manchester Literary and Philosophical Society on 15 January 1907 He was elected Fellow of the Royal Society in 1918 and knighted in the 1929 Birthday Honours. He was awarded the Bessemer Gold Medal in 1931 by the Iron and Steel Institute.

He married Ethel Mary Lomas in 1905. He was found dead from drowning in a stream after suffering a heart attack while out walking alone in the Clyne valley, Swansea.
