= Proceedings of the South Wales Institute of Engineers =

Proceedings of the South Wales Institute of Engineers is the annual journal of the South Wales Institute of Engineers. It contains scholarly and popular articles on engineering, scientific and economic topics. It was initially published as Transactions of the South Wales Institute of Engineers (Vol. 1, 1859 to Vol. 62 (1946), then renamed Proceedings of the South Wales Institute of Engineers, Vol. 63 (1947)- Vol. 99 (1991). In 1992 it was renamed Engineering South Wales.

The journal is being digitized by the Welsh Journals Online project at the National Library of Wales and is considered by the Library as one of "the most significant journal and periodical titles" in Wales.
