= Stead Primary Care Hospital =

The Stead Primary Care Hospital
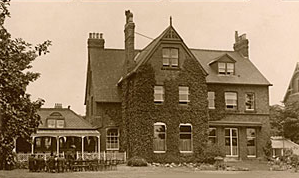
- Everdon House, the home of the Stead Memorial Hospital, prior to its expansion

- Shown in North Yorkshire

Geography
- Location: Redcar, Redcar and Cleveland, England, United Kingdom
- Coordinates: 54.6159°N 1.079°W

Organisation
- Care system: Public NHS
- Type: Emergency

History
- Founded: 1929
- Closed: Yes

Links
- Lists: Hospitals in England

The Stead Primary Care Hospital was a NHS-run hospital located on Kirkleatham Street in the town of Redcar, England.

== History ==
The hospital was opened as the "Stead Memorial Hospital", in memory of metallurgical doctor John Edward Stead, in Everdon house, his former home, in 1929. It operated for 81 years, becoming the town's main hospital until 2010, when it was then closed and left abandoned. It became a popular site for urban explorers prior to its demolition.

The Redcar Primary Care Hospital, constructed at a cost of £30 million, took on all its services and effectively replaced the Stead in 2010, and continues operating as the town's major care facility. There is a memorial to its predecessor in the main lobby.
