= John Chipman (metallurgist) =

American metallurgist and physical chemist (1897–1983)

- Born: April 25, 1897; Tallahassee, Florida, U.S.
- Died: May 14, 1983 (aged 86); Winchester, Massachusetts, U.S.
- Education: University of California, Berkeley (Ph.D., 1926)
- Known for: Application of physical chemistry to steelmaking
- Awards: Bessemer Gold Medal; Benjamin F. Fairless Award; Howe Medal
- Scientific career
- Fields: Metallurgy; physical chemistry
- Institutions: Massachusetts Institute of Technology

John Chipman (April 25, 1897 – May 14, 1983) was an American physical chemist and metallurgist known for applying principles of physical chemistry to the study of liquid metals and steelmaking processes. He served as head of the Department of Metallurgy at the Massachusetts Institute of Technology (MIT) from 1946 to 1962 and made significant contributions to metallurgical science, including work on the Manhattan Project during World War II.

== Early life and education ==
Chipman was born in Tallahassee, Florida. He studied at the University of the South and later earned a Ph.D. in physical chemistry from the University of California, Berkeley in 1926.

== Career ==
Chipman began his career as an assistant professor of chemistry at the Georgia School of Technology and later worked as a research engineer at the University of Michigan, where he conducted early studies on chemical reactions in steel production. His research in the early 1930s on steelmaking reactions earned him the Henry Marion Howe Medal from the American Society for Metals.

In 1937, he joined the Massachusetts Institute of Technology as a professor of metallurgy and became head of the department in 1946. He served in that role until his retirement as professor emeritus in 1962.

During World War II, Chipman took leave from MIT to join the Manhattan Project at the University of Chicago, where he headed the metallurgy section. His work included developing methods for converting powdered uranium into solid castings, addressing shortages of usable uranium metal for nuclear research.

Chipman’s research focused on the thermodynamics and kinetics of metallurgical processes, particularly the behavior of liquid iron and slag systems in steelmaking. He was among the pioneers in applying physical chemistry to metallurgical processes, helping to establish the field on a theoretical foundation.

== Honors and recognition ==
Chipman received awards for his contributions to metallurgy, including the 1955 Bessemer Gold Medal of the Iron and Steel Institute and the Benjamin F. Fairless Award of the American Institute of Mining, Metallurgical, and Petroleum Engineers (AIME).

He was elected to the National Academy of Sciences in 1955. He also served as president of the American Society for Metals and the AIME.

== Personal life and death ==
Chipman died on May 14, 1983, at his home in Winchester, Massachusetts, at the age of 86. Chipman was survived by his wife, Ruth H. Hayes, a son, David Randolph Chipman, and a daughter, Ruth Elizabeth Chipman Busch.

== See also ==
- Metallurgy
- Physical chemistry
- Manhattan Project
