= Mangalloy =

Alloy steel containing around 13% manganese

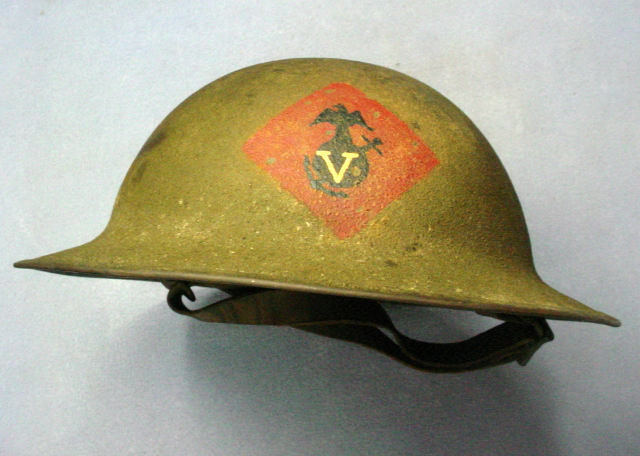
A World War I M1917, made from Hadfield steel

Mangalloy, also called manganese steel or Hadfield steel, is an alloy steel containing an average of around 13% manganese. Mangalloy is known for its high impact strength and resistance to abrasion once in its work-hardened state.

== Material properties ==
Mangalloy is made by alloying steel, containing 0.8 to 1.25% carbon, with 11 to 15% manganese. Mangalloy is a unique non-magnetic steel with extreme anti-wear properties. The material is very resistant to abrasion and will achieve up to three times its surface hardness during conditions of impact, without any increase in brittleness which is usually associated with hardness. This allows mangalloy to retain its toughness.

Most steels contain 0.15 to 0.8% manganese. High strength alloys often contain 1 to 1.8% manganese. At about 1.5% manganese content, the steel becomes brittle, and this trait increases until about 4 to 5% manganese content is reached. At this point, the steel will pulverize at the strike of a hammer. Further increase in the manganese content will increase both hardness and ductility. At around 10% manganese content the steel will remain in its austenite form at room temperature if cooled correctly. Both hardness and ductility reach their highest points around 12%, depending on other alloying agents. The primary of these alloying agents is carbon, because the addition of manganese to low-carbon steel has little effect, but increases dramatically with increasing carbon content. The original Hadfield steel contained about 1.0% carbon. Other alloying agents may include metals like nickel and chromium; added most often to austenitic steels as an austenite stabilizer; molybdenum and vanadium; used in non-austenitic steels as a ferrite stabilizer; or even non-metallic elements such as silicon.

Mangalloy has fair yield strength but very high tensile strength, typically anywhere between 350 and 900 megapascals (MPa), which rises rapidly as it work hardens. Unlike other forms of steel, when stretched to the breaking point, the material does not "neck down" (get smaller at the weakest point) and then tear apart. Instead, the metal necks and work hardens, increasing the tensile strength to very high levels, sometimes as high as 2000 MPa. This causes the adjacent material to neck down, harden, and this continues until the entire piece is much longer and thinner. The typical elongation can be anywhere from 18 to 65%, depending on both the exact composition of the alloy and prior heat-treatments. Alloys with manganese contents ranging from 12 to 30% are able to resist the brittle effects of cold, sometimes to temperatures in the range of −196 °F (−127 °C).

Mangalloy is heat treatable, but the manganese lowers the temperature at which austenite transforms into ferrite. Unlike carbon steel, mangalloy softens rather than hardens when rapidly cooled, restoring the ductility from a work-hardened state. Most grades are ready for use after annealing and then quenching from a yellow heat, with no further need of tempering, and usually have a normal Brinell hardness of around 200 HB, (roughly the same as 304 stainless steel), but, due to its unique properties, the indentation hardness has very little effect on determining the scratch hardness (the abrasion and impact resistance of the metal). Another source says that the basic Brinell hardness of manganese steel according to the original Hadfield specification is 220 but that with impact wear the surface hardness will increase to over 550.

Many of mangalloy's uses are often limited by its difficulty in machining; sometimes described as having "zero machinability." The metal cannot be softened by annealing and hardens rapidly under cutting and grinding tools, usually requiring special tooling to machine. The material can be drilled with extreme difficulty using diamond or carbide. Although it can be forged from a yellow heat, it may crumble if hammered when white-hot, and is much tougher than carbon steel when heated. It can be cut with an oxy-acetylene torch, but plasma or laser cutting is the preferred method. Despite its extreme hardness and tensile strength, the material may not always be rigid. It can be formed by cold rolling or cold bending.

The tribological behavior of structural alloys during sliding friction is strongly influenced by microstructure and phase composition. Austenitic manganese steels and manganese cast irons exhibit complex wear mechanisms associated with strain hardening, plastic deformation of the surface layer and the formation of wear debris during friction. Such materials may develop hardened surface layers during sliding contact, which significantly influences wear resistance and friction stability.

== History ==
Robert Forester Mushet had experimented with manganese in steel at the Bessemer works in 1856, and used as much as 2-5 per cent in his self-hardening tool steel. Alexandre Pourcel, of the French Terre-Noire Cie., was able by the 1878 World's Fair in Paris to produce ferro-manganese with as much as 80 per cent of manganese and only a small amount of carbon. Hadfield translated a pamphlet that accompanied Pourcel's exhibit and was greatly interested in the product.

Mangalloy was created by Robert Hadfield in 1882, becoming the first alloy steel to both become a commercial success and to exhibit behavior radically differing from carbon steel. Thus, it is generally considered to mark the birth of alloy steels.

Benjamin Huntsman was one of the first to begin adding other metals to steel. His process of making crucible steel, invented in 1740, was the first time steel was able to be fully melted in a crucible. Huntsman had already been using various fluxes to help remove impurities from steel, and soon began adding a manganese-rich pig-iron called Spiegeleisen, which greatly reduced the presence of impurities in his steel. In 1816, a German researcher Carl J. B. Karsten noted that adding fairly large amounts of manganese to iron would increase its hardness without affecting its malleability and toughness, but the mix was not homogeneous and the results of the experiment were not considered to be reliable. "and no one understood that the real reason why the iron mined in Noricum produced such superb steel lay in the fact that it contained a small amount of manganese uncontaminated by phosphorus, arsenic, or sulphur, and so was the raw material of manganese steel." In 1860, Sir Henry Bessemer, trying to perfect his Bessemer process of steel making, found that adding spiegeleisen to the steel after it was blown helped to remove excess sulfur and oxygen. Sulfur combines with iron to form a sulfide that has a lower melting point than steel, causing weak spots, which prevented hot rolling. Manganese is usually added to most modern steels in small amounts because of its powerful ability to remove impurities.

Hadfield was in search of a steel that could be used for the casting of tram wheels which would exhibit both hardness and toughness, since ordinary carbon steels do not combine those properties. Steel can be hardened by rapid cooling, but loses its toughness, becoming brittle. Steel castings can not usually be cooled rapidly, for irregular shapes can warp or crack. Mangalloy proved to be extremely suitable for casting, as it did not form gas pockets called "blow-holes", and did not display the extreme brittleness of other castings.

Hadfield had been studying the results of others who experimented with mixing various elements with steel, such as Benjamin Huntsman and A.H. Allen. At the time the manufacture of steel was an art rather than a science, produced by skilled craftsmen who were often very secretive. Thus, no metallurgical data about steel existed before 1860, so information about the various alloys was sporadic and often unreliable. Hadfield became interested in the addition of manganese and silicon. The Terre Noire Company had created an alloy called "ferro-manganese", containing up to 80% manganese. Hadfield began by mixing ferro-manganese with crucible steel and silicon, producing an alloy of 7.45% manganese, but the material was unsatisfactory for his purposes. In his next attempt, he left out the silicon and added more ferro-manganese to the mix, achieving an alloy with 1.35% carbon and 13.76% manganese. Upon creating mangalloy, Hadfield tested the material, thinking that the results must have been erroneous. It looked dull and soft, with a submetallic luster similar in appearance to lead, yet sheared the teeth off his file. It would not hold an edge as a cutting tool, yet could not be cut with saws nor machined on a lathe. It was non-magnetic despite containing over 80% iron, and had very high electrical resistance. Attempts to grind it simply glazed and polished the surface. Most striking, when heated and quenched, it behaved almost opposite to plain carbon-steel. After performing several hundred tests, he realized that they must be accurate, although the reason for the combination of hardness and toughness defied any explanation at the time. Hadfield wrote, "Is there any case similar to this among other alloys of iron, if the term alloy may be used? No metallurgical treatise refers to them... Possibly when the nature of the laws governing alloys is better understood, this will be found to be only one of other cases...".

Hadfield's invention was the first alloy of steel to demonstrate considerable differences in properties compared to carbon steel. In the modern age, it is known that manganese inhibits the transformation of the malleable austenite phase into hard brittle martensite that takes place for normal steels when they are quenched in the hardening procedure. The austenite of Hadfield steels is thermodynamically unstable and will transform into martensite when subject to mechanical impact thus forming the hard surface layer.

Hadfield patented his steel in 1883, but spent the next five years perfecting the mixture, so did not present it to the public until 1887. He finally settled on an alloy containing 12 to 14% manganese and 1.0% carbon, which was ductile enough to be indented but so hard it could not be cut. It became the first alloy steel to become commercially viable. Hadfield originally marketed his steel for use in railways and trams, but quickly began producing it for everything from saw plates to safes.

== Use ==
Mangalloy has been used in the mining industry, cement mixers, rock crushers, railway switches and crossings, crawler treads for tractors and other high impact and abrasive environments. It is also used in high impact environments like inside a shot peening machine. These alloys are finding new uses as cryogenic steels, due to their high strength at very low temperatures. Most means of metal cutting used by thieves, such as reciprocating saws or angle grinders, often have extreme difficulty cutting through Mangalloy. This makes it a common material for high-end bike and motorcycle locks.

=== Tribological behaviour ===
Austenitic manganese steels are widely used in applications involving severe impact and sliding contact due to their ability to undergo strain hardening of the surface layer during friction loading. Experimental studies have shown that high-nitrogen modifications of such steels may exhibit improved wear resistance associated with stabilization of the austenitic structure, plastic deformation of the contact layer and formation of characteristic fragmented wear debris during dry sliding conditions.

Under rolling contact conditions, austenitic manganese steels may develop subsurface microcracks and surface damage related to cyclic plastic deformation and fragmentation of wear particles. Hydrogen absorption has been reported to modify fracture mechanisms and accelerate degradation processes during rolling friction loading.

Such degradation phenomena are generally associated with the accumulation of contact stresses beneath the surface, leading to crack nucleation and propagation typical of rolling contact fatigue. The tribological performance of work-hardening steels is therefore strongly influenced by microstructural stability, phase transformations and environmental factors such as lubrication conditions or the presence of reactive species.

Repeated contact loading may result in the formation of hardened surface layers combined with subsurface fatigue damage and the generation of oxidized wear debris, which can further influence friction behaviour and material removal mechanisms.

== See also ==
- Ferromanganese, an ferroalloy with much higher manganese content (usually around 80%), not a steel but rather an ingredient used in making steels
