= John Edward Stead =

British metallurgist (1851–1923)

John Edward Stead FRS (11 October 1851 – 31 October 1923) was a British metallurgist, elected to the Royal Society in 1903. He worked for the Bolckow Vaughan and was President of the Iron and Steel Institute.

His brother was William Thomas Stead, prominent newspaper editor who died on the RMS Titanic when it sank in April 1912.

== Achievements ==
For his work in the metallurgical field, Stead received three honorary doctorates, was made a fellow of the Royal Society and, in 1901, was awarded the Bessemer Gold Medal from the Iron and Steel Institute.

== Legacy ==
In memory of his - and his wife Mary's - social work in the Teesside area, his home, the Everdon villa in Redcar, was converted into the Stead Memorial Hospital after his death in 1923. It opened in 1929, and, after growing to become the town's primary care hospital, closed in 2010. As of 2013, it was undergoing demolition.
