= Ken Mills =

British chemistry professor

- Ken Mills in 2011, Hampton
- Born: Kenneth C Mills; 13 February 1935; Doncaster, United Kingdom
- Died: 13 May 2018 (aged 83)
- Scientific career
- Workplaces: Newcastle University; Sheffield University; Carnegie Institute of Technology, Pittsburgh; US Steel, Edgar Bain Research Laboratories; National Physical Laboratory (United Kingdom); Imperial College London

Kenneth Claughan Mills (13 February 1935 – 13 May 2018), was head of the Slags group at the National Physical Laboratory (United Kingdom) and a visiting professor in the Department of Materials at Imperial College London.

== Career ==
=== Early years ===
Mills graduated in chemistry from the University of Newcastle in 1956 and, in 1960, was awarded a PhD by Sheffield University for work on carbides in steels and their effect on creep strength. From 1960 to 1962, he continued his research in the US, at the Carnegie Institute of Technology in Pittsburgh, working on the thermodynamics of alloys at high temperature. There then followed a short period at the US Steel, Edgar Bain Research Laboratories working with E.T. Turkdogan.

=== National Physical Laboratory (1963 - 1999) ===
On returning to the UK in 1963, Mills joined the National Physical Laboratory (United Kingdom) in Teddington, where he developed novel measurement methods for thermodynamic properties at high temperatures.

In 1974, he became head of a group working on the measurement of physico-chemical properties of materials related to heat and fluid flow in high-temperature processes, known as the Slags group. The group consisted of, amongst others: Brian Keene, Sandy Powell, Rob Brooks, Abayomi Olusanya, Abas Shirali, Austin Day, Brian Monaghan, Lindsay Chapman, Richard Andon, Amanda Barnicoat, Mike Richardson, David Hayes and Peter Quested. Quested took over the running of the group in 1993; Mills officially retired at 60, although he continued to work at NPL.

Mills' main research was carried out on metals and alloys, slags and refractories. In addition to his experimental work he carried out major reviews on the properties of these materials; he was a major contributor to the Slag Atlas (2nd edition 1995).

He had great interest in the mechanisms underlying processing problems in high-temperature processes, such as variable weld penetration in GTA/TIG welding and mould flux behaviour in the continuous casting of steel. To illustrate surface tension driven Marangoni flow in liquid metals, Mills would show (and occasionally consume) a glass of brandy in presentations. Mills gave courses in more than 10 countries on mould fluxes and their impact on the continuous casting process.

=== Imperial College (1994 - 2018) ===
In 1994, Mills joined Imperial College London as a Professor and lectured on metal production and heat and mass transfer. His research at Imperial College has been principally focused on mould fluxes for continuous casting and slags used in other steelmaking processes and on thermo-physical properties of alloys and slags. He also revived his interest in the estimation of the properties of slags and alloys from their chemical compositions. Mills gave courses on the estimation of slag properties in South Africa and at the TMS Conference 2012 in Florida.

In 2002, the "Mills Symposium on Metals, Slags, and Glasses: High Temperatures, Properties and Phenomena" was held to celebrate Mills' contributions to science.

=== Awards ===
- Williams award, Institute of Materials, 1992.
- Kroll medal, Institute of Materials, 1996
- Honorary Membership of the Iron and Steel Institute of Japan, 2003
- Williams medal, The Institute of Materials, Minerals and Mining, 2013
- Bessemer Gold Medal, The Institute of Materials, Minerals and Mining, 2013. For outstanding services to the steel industry - Mills was cited as "one of the first scientists to help transform the powder metallurgy from alchemy to science" and "renowned specialists from around the world supported the nomination."

=== Publications ===
Mills has authored / co-authored over 200 scientific publications, a large number being on thermophysical property data, particularly of slags. Mills "is the most cited author in the field of mould powders"

Books:

- "Thermodynamic Data for Inorganic Sulphides, Selenides and Tellurides", Butterworth-Heinemann, 1974, ISBN 040870537X
- "Slag Atlas", major contributor to 2nd edition, 1995, Verlag Stahleisen mbH, ISBN 3514004579
- "Recommended values of thermophysical properties for selected commercial alloys", 2002, Woodhead Publishing Ltd, ISBN 1855735695
- Mills' final published book, "The Casting Powders Book" co-authored with Carl-Åke Däcker, will be published in August 2018, ISBN ISBN 9783319536149.
