= Nicholas Timothy Belaiew =

Nikolai Timofeevich Beliaev or Nicholas Timothy Belaiew (26 June 1878 – 5 November 1955) was a Russian metallurgist. He was famous for his studies on Damascus steel and the idea of crystallization in metals and the production of Widmanstatten structures. He also wrote on the history of steel making.

Beliaev was born in St. Petersburg to General T. M. Beliaev and Maria Nikolayevna Septjurina. He was educated at Mikhailovskaya Artilleriiskaya Academy and was trained under Dmitry Konstantinovich Chernov and Henry Le Chatelier. He became a professor of metallurgy in 1909. During World War I he was wounded and he was sent to England in 1915. He received a Bessemer Gold Medal in 1937 from the British Institute of Steel and Iron in London. A major contribution was on the studies of crystal structure in steels both man-made and of meteoric origin and examined their mechanical properties. He also took an interest in Icelandic research.
