= Edward Windsor Richards =

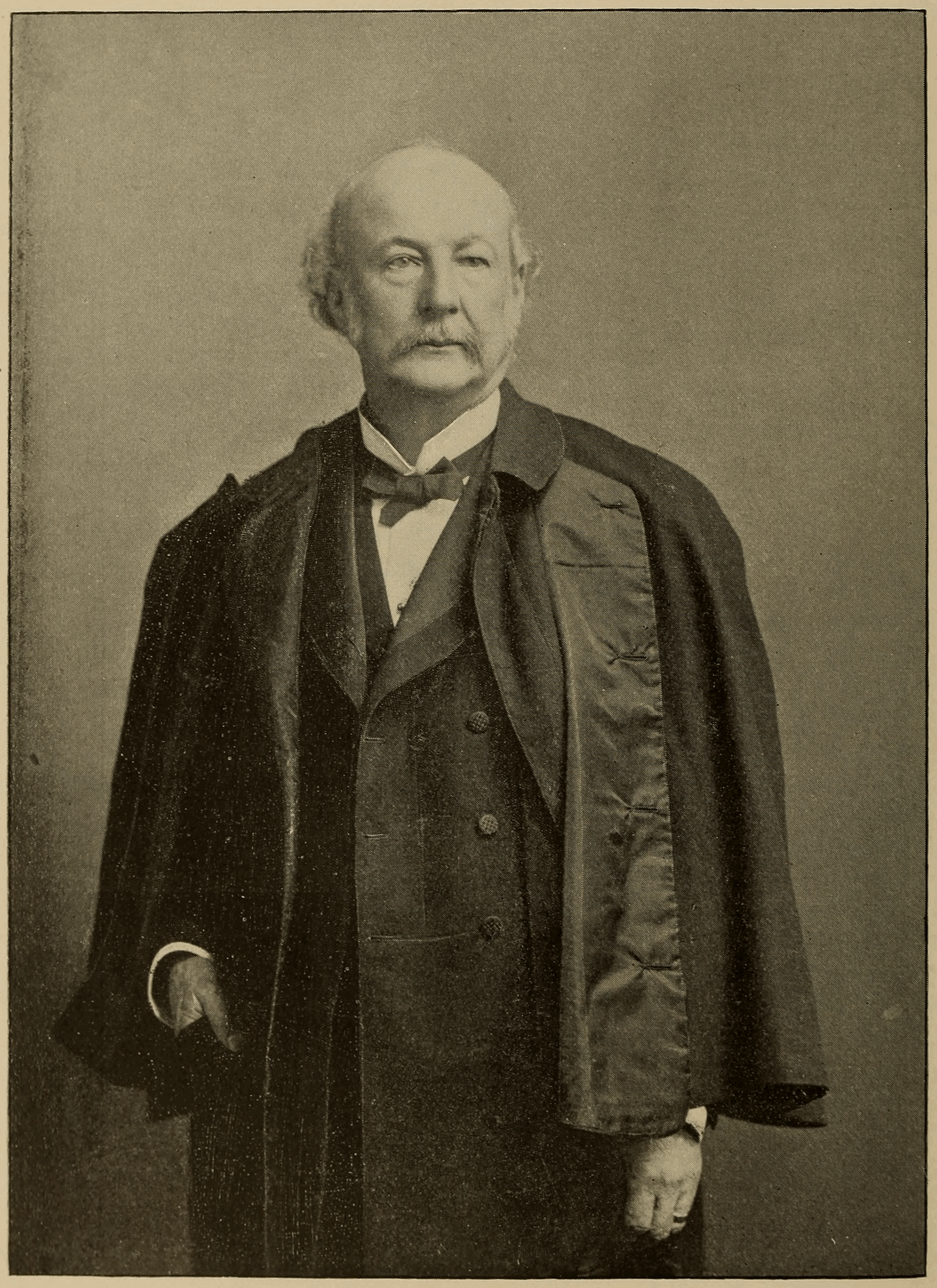
Windsor Richards was featured in an article in Cassier's Magazine in December 1894, accompanied by this photo.

Edward Windsor Richards (August 1831 – 12 November 1921), known as Windsor Richards, was a Welsh engineer, and steel maker.

== Life ==
Richards was born in Dowlais, and was educated at Monmouth and Christ's Hospital. He was an apprentice at the Rhymney Iron and Steel Works. He studied the economy of utilizing the waste heat in blast furnace gases. Richards worked as assistant, and chief engineer of the Tredegar Iron Works. By 1871 he was general manager of the Ebbw Vale Iron Works, where he planned the Bessemer Steel Department. In 1875, Richards was General Manager of the Eston Ironworks of Bolckow Vaughan and Co, North Yorkshire. These included three hæmatite blast furnaces, and his work with Sidney Gilchrist Thomas contributed to the development of the Gilchrist-Thomas process. In 1884 he was awarded the Bessemer Gold Medal by the Council of the Iron and Steel Institute for his work in steel manufacturing. In 1888, he worked on the manufacture of wrought iron, at the Low Moor Works south of Bradford. He retired in 1898. Richards was President of the Institution of Mechanical Engineers in 1896 and 1897, and was President of the Iron and Steel Institute, of which he was an Original Member, in 1894.

He was appointed a Deputy Lieutenant for Monmouthshire on 11 April 1902. He also served as High Sheriff of Monmouthshire in 1902.

In 1907, Richards bought the decommissioned naval fort on St Catherine’s island, Tenby. He lavishly restored it and used it as his private, holiday residence until his death, in 1921.

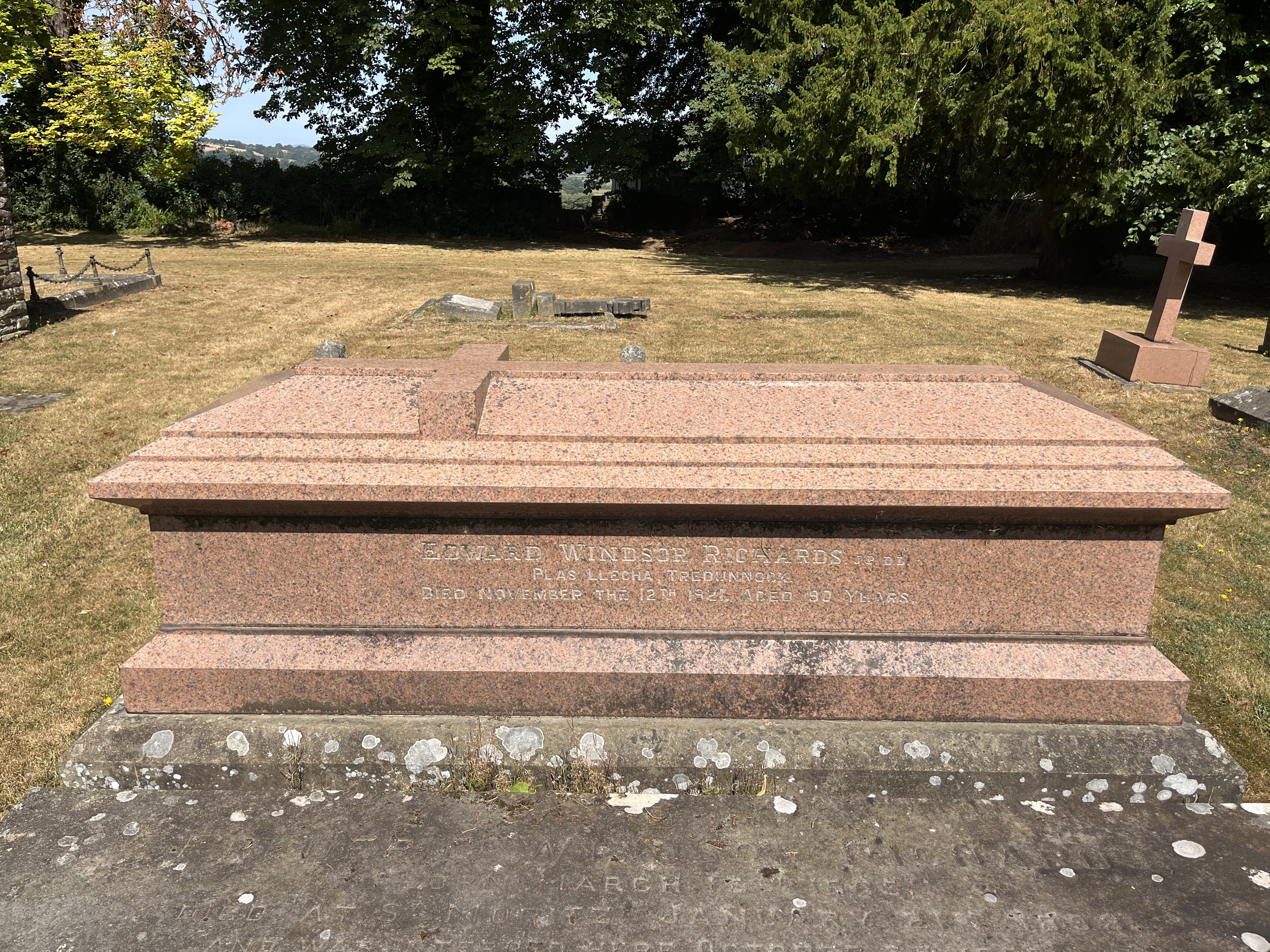
Richards' tomb at St Andrew's Church, Tredunnock.

He died in 1921 at his home, Plas Llecha, Tredunnock, Caerleon at the age of 90.

Professional and academic associations
Preceded by Alexander Blackie William Kennedy	President of the Institution of Mechanical Engineers; 1896–1897	Succeeded by Samuel Waite Johnson
