= Geoffrey Brooks =

Professor of Engineering born 1962

Personal details
- Born: 9 November 1962 (age 63) Melbourne, Australia
- Occupation: Professor of engineering

Geoffrey Brooks (born 9 November 1962) is an Australian professor of engineering at the Swinburne University of Technology, known for fundamentals of steelmaking and non-ferrous metallurgy. His research in these fields has earned him awards from organizations such as the Association for Iron and Steel Technology (AIST), the Minerals, Metals and Materials Society (TMS) and the Institute of Materials, Minerals and Mining (IOM3) as well as winning several best paper awards with his co-workers in the field of pyrometallurgy. In 2023 he was awarded the Bessemer Gold Medal recognising his contribution to the study of steelmaking kinetics and education.

== Research ==
Brooks’ key work includes modelling of steelmaking, leading teams on interaction of jets and liquids in steelmaking, heat transfer in steelmaking and reaction kinetics of steelmaking process. Collaborating with researchers at McMaster University and Swinburne University of Technology, he developed the Bloated Droplet Theory in Oxygen Steelmaking, correlating the steelmaking kinetics with iron droplets bloating and reacting with FeO rich slag.

== Media recognition ==
Brooks has been interviewed on several occasions in the Australian media on matters relating to the Australian steel industry but also on his research into processing minerals on the moon. He has been a regular contributor to The Conversation commenting on a range of issues relating to the metallurgical industry.
