= Kenneth Mills (historian) =

Historian of the early modern Spanish world

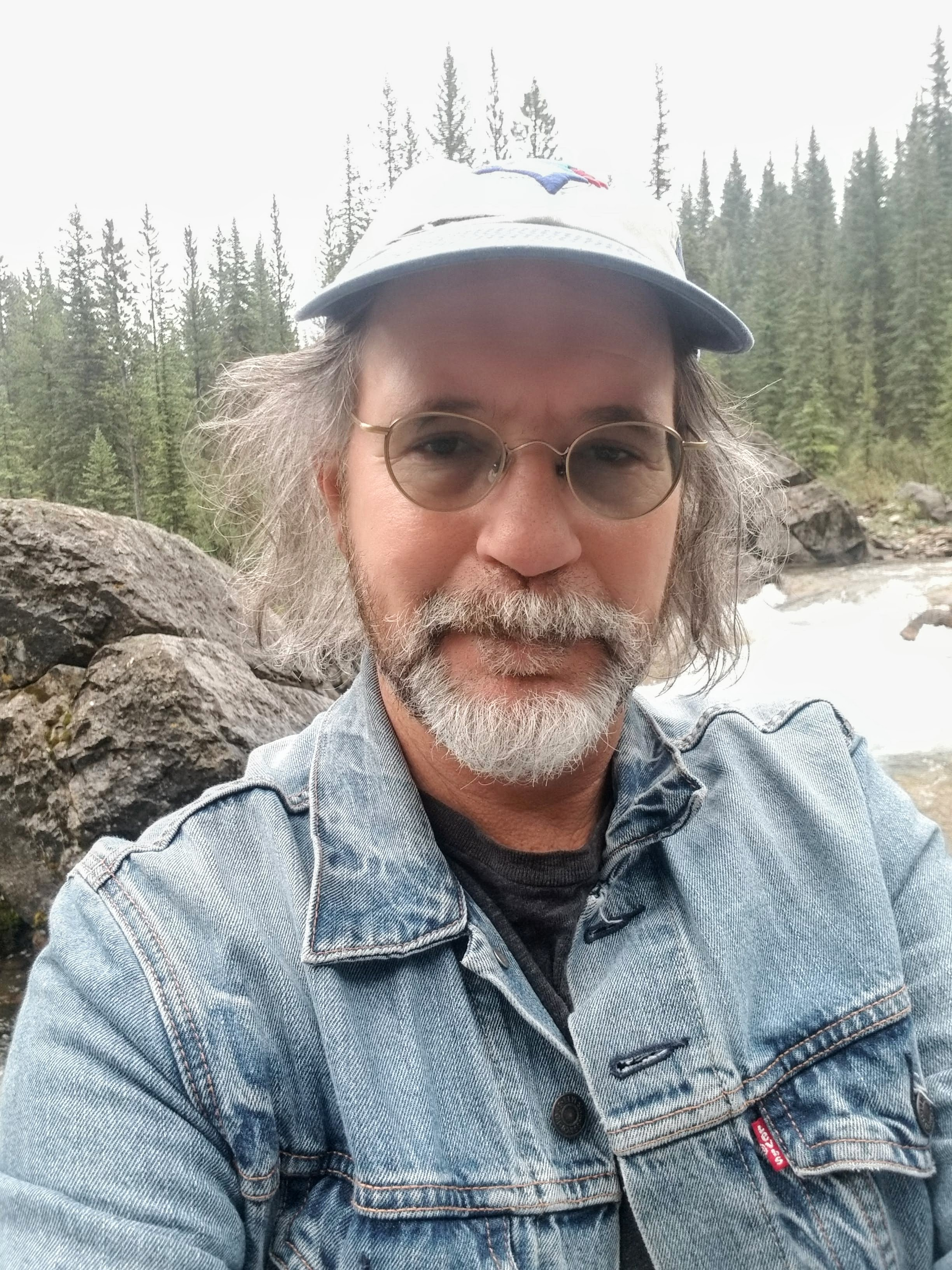
- Born: 1964 (age 61–62); Saskatoon, Saskatchewan, Canada
- Known for: Early modern Spanish world history, colonial Latin American religious history, trans-oceanic Iberian studies
- Awards: Rhodes Scholarship (1988) Paul W. McQuillen Memorial Research Fellowship (2019) John Rich Faculty Fellowship (2018–2019)

Academic background
- Education: University of Alberta (BA, MA) University of Oxford (D.Phil., Balliol College)

Kenneth Mills (born c. 1964) is a Canadian-born historian of the early modern Spanish world. He serves as the J. Frederick Hoffman Professor of History at the University of Michigan in Ann Arbor, Michigan.

His research focuses on the religious and cultural transformations in the trans-oceanic Iberian world, particularly the development and adaptation of Catholic Christianities in sixteenth and seventeenth-century Spanish America.

== Biography ==
Mills was born in Saskatoon, Saskatchewan, and raised in Red Deer, Alberta, Canada. He received his B.A. and M.A. from the University of Alberta in Edmonton, Canada. In 1988, he was awarded a Rhodes Scholarship and earned his D.Phil. from the University of Oxford (Balliol College) in 1992. He began his academic career as a Junior Research Fellow at Wadham College, Oxford (1992–1993), and was a Tutor in Modern History at Oxford (1991–1993). He later held academic positions at the University of Liverpool (1992–1993), Princeton University (1993–2003), and the University of Toronto (2003–2015). Since 2015, he has held the J. Frederick Hoffman Professorship in History at the University of Michigan. Kenneth Mills has supervised or contributed significantly to the research of over thirty doctoral candidates with diverse interests in early modern, medieval, and colonial Latin American histories.

== Research ==
Mills's scholarship is noted for its interdisciplinary approach, integrating history with literature, anthropology, art history, and religious studies. Alongside Professor Kris Lane of Tulane University, he coordinates Horror & Enchantment, an international working group of twenty-five scholars currently preparing a manuscript for publication.

== Editorial and advisory roles ==
Mills has served on the editorial board of the journal Colonial Latin American Review since 1998. He also currently serves on the editorial advisory boards for the book series The Iberian Religious World (Brill) and Catholic Practice in the Americas (Fordham University Press), as well as for the Journal of Iberian and Latin American Research (Sydney, Australia), and the Comité Consultativo of Nueva Corónica (Universidad Nacional de San Marcos, Lima, Peru).

He is a regular evaluator for academic presses including Yale University Press, Cambridge University Press, Oxford University Press, University of California Press, and Stanford University Press. He has also reviewed for institutions such as the European Commission, American Council of Learned Societies, MacArthur Foundation, Guggenheim Foundation, and the Netherlands Institute for Advanced Study.

== Distinctions and fellowships ==
Mills's research and writing have been recognized for distinctions throughout his career. Highlights include a long-term fellowship from the National Endowment for the Humanities at the John Carter Brown Library in 2003, to which he returned in 2019 as the recipient of the Paul W. McQuillen Memorial Research Fellowship. In 2006, he was the Nicholas Hamner Invited Lecturer at Western Michigan University, and in 2011, he held a visiting professorship at the Centre de la Méditerrannée Moderne et Contemporaine at the Université de Nice Sophia-Antipolis in France. Mills was named Distinguished Visitor at Haverford College in 2016, and was awarded the John Rich Faculty Fellowship at the University of Michigan’s Institute for the Humanities for the 2018–2019 academic year. In 2015, he was appointed to the J. Frederick Hoffman Professorship in History at the University of Michigan. Most recently, from 2023 to 2024, Kenneth Mills held an Individual Research Fellowship at the Netherlands Institute for Advanced Study.

== Selected publications ==
- Idolatry and Its Enemies: Colonial Andean Religion and Extirpation, 1640–1750 (1997, 2012)
- "Ocaña’s Mondragón in the ‘Eighth Wonder of the World,’" in Christian Interculture: Texts and Voices from Colonial and Postcolonial Worlds, ed. Arun W. Jones (2020), pp. 130–161.
- "Religion in the Early Modern Atlantic World," in The Oxford Handbook of the Atlantic World 1450–1850, eds. Nicholas Canny and Philip Morgan (2011), pp. 433–448.
- "The Naturalization of Andean Christianities," in The Cambridge History of Christianity, Vol. 6: Reform and Expansion, 1500–1660, ed. R. Po-chia Hsia (2007), pp. 508–539.
- Lexikon of the Hispanic Baroque: Transatlantic Exchange and Transformation (2013), co-edited with Evonne Levy
- Colonial Latin America: A Documentary History (2002), co-authored with William B. Taylor and Sandra Lauderdale Graham
- Colonial Spanish America: A Documentary History (1998), co-authored with William B. Taylor
- Conversion: Old Worlds and New (2003), co-edited with Anthony Grafton
- Conversion in Late Antiquity and the Early Middle Ages: Seeing and Believing (2003), co-edited with Anthony Grafton
- "The Limits of Religious Coercion in Mid-Colonial Peru," in Past and Present 145 (November 1994), pp. 84–121.
- An Evil Lost to View? An Investigation of Post-Evangelisation Andean Religion in Mid-Colonial Peru (1994)
