= Robert Hadfield =

British metallurgist (1858–1940)

Sir Robert Hadfield, Bt
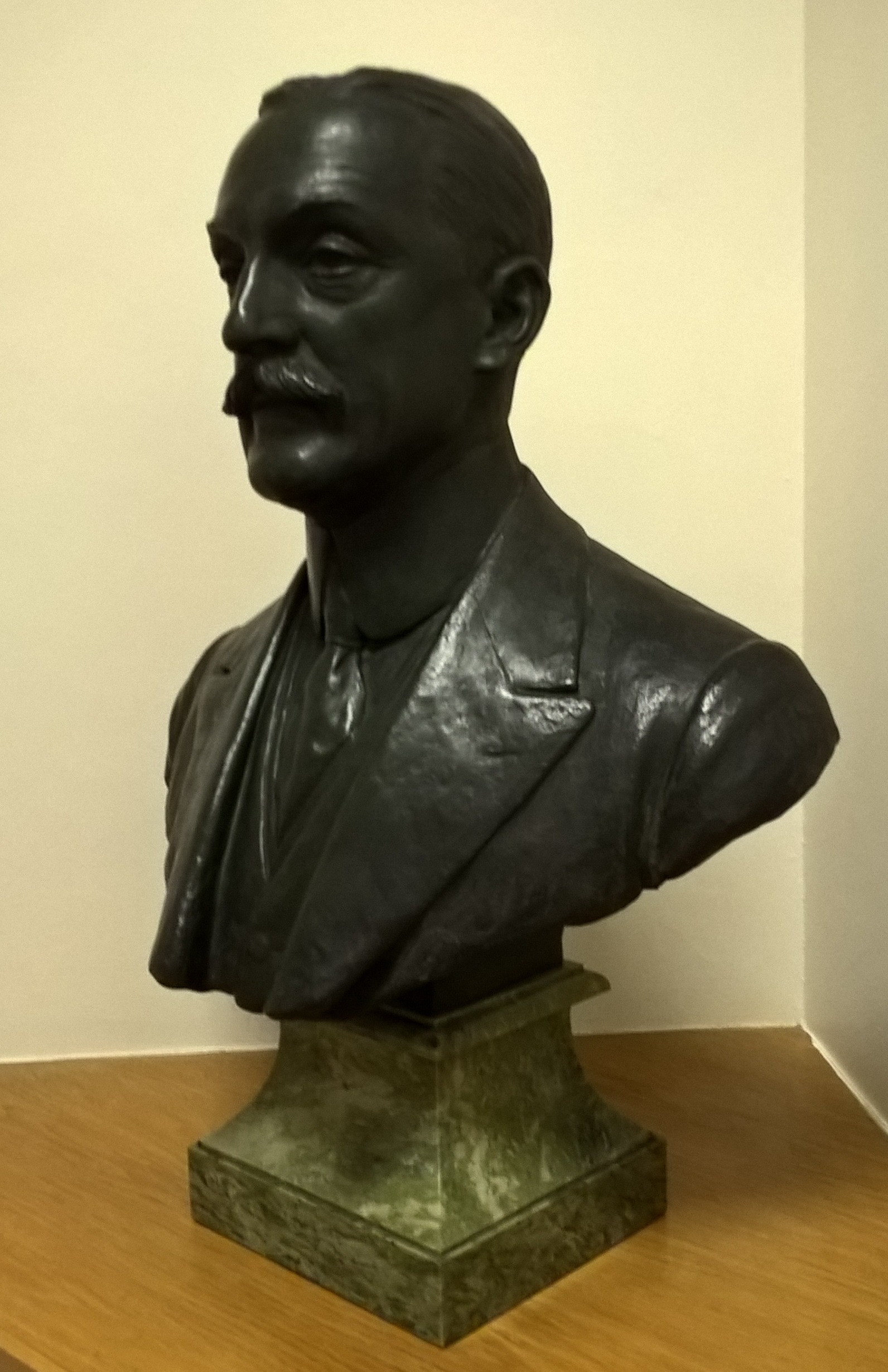
- Bust in the Sir Robert Hadfield Building, University of Sheffield
- Born: Robert Abbott Hadfield; 28 November 1858; Sheffield
- Died: 30 September 1940 (aged 81); Surrey
- Engineering career
- Projects: Manganese steel; Silicon steel
- Awards: Bessemer Gold Medal (1904); Elliott Cresson Medal (1910); John Fritz Medal (1921); Albert Medal (1935); Fellow of the Royal Society

Sir Robert Abbott Hadfield, 1st Baronet FRS (28 November 1858 in Sheffield – 30 September 1940 in Surrey) was an English metallurgist, noted for his 1882 discovery of manganese steel, one of the first steel alloys. He also invented silicon steel, initially for mechanical properties (patents in 1886) which have made the alloy a material of choice for springs and some fine blades, though it has also become important in electrical applications for its magnetic behaviour.

== Life ==
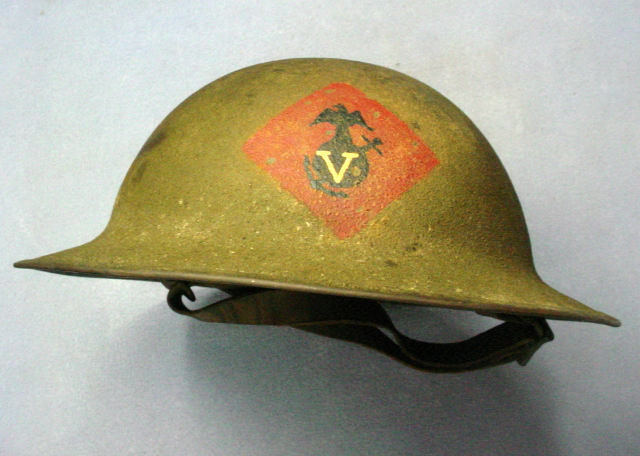
World War I Brodie helmet, made from Hadfield steel

Hadfield was born 28 November 1858 in Attercliffe, then still a village near Sheffield. Hadfield's father, also named Robert Hadfield, owned Hadfield's Steel Foundry in Sheffield and in 1872 was the first manufacturer of steel castings in Britain. He declined to use patented technology from France and developed his own, thus laying the foundations for what was to become one of Britain's leading armament firms.

Robert the younger decided against Oxford and Cambridge, and entered work as an apprentice in 1875. He was successful and by the age of 24 had taken over the management due to his father's ill health.

Hadfield took out two patents on manganese steel in 1883--the British precursors to U.S. patent 303,150 and U.S. patent 303,151--and exhibited the material before the Institution of Mechanical Engineers the next year. In February 1888 he presented a paper to the Institution of Civil Engineers about his further research on manganese in steel, which included the discovery that an alloy containing between 12 and 14 per cent manganese had special utility. Amongst other properties: in a tensile test it drew out uniformly whilst in most metals local elongation or ‘necking’ occurs, and magnetism is absent in it. In Brinell units the surface hardness increased on deformation from 200 to 550 or 580 (approaching that which will scratch glass) according to measurements by Floris Osmond. Its hardness and non-magnetic properties gave advantage in the arms industry, especially for British helmets.

The younger Hadfield took over the business in 1888 on his father's death. The firm was then made into a limited company, and he became chairman and managing director. The younger man was then 30 years of age.

In 1889 Hadfield published with the Iron and Steel Institute the results of his investigations into iron alloyed with silicon. Studies of iron with aluminium, chromium, nickel and tungsten followed in 1890, 1892, 1899, and 1903, respectively.

In 1891 he adopted both the eight-hour workday at his company, and the thermoelectric pyrometer, which had been developed by the Frenchman Henry Louis Le Chatelier.

In 1899 a paper in the Royal Dublin Society was published by Barrett, Brown and Hadfield of seminal importance to magnetism, in a hundred alloys of iron.

Hadfield collaborated with James Dewar in the study of very low temperatures on the properties of metals, and with Heike Kamerlingh Onnes at the University of Leyden Cryogenic Laboratory after his appointment there in 1905. They discovered that a characteristic of face-centred cubic lattice structure metals would actually become more ductile at extremely low temperatures, whilst those with a body-centred cubic lattice became brittle.

From 1913 until 1920 Hadfield was president of the Faraday Society, and as a farewell he organized there a seminar on microscopy and the photo-micrograph.

In 1925 under his name appeared the book Metallurgy and its Influence on Modern Progress; Faraday and his metallurgical researches appeared in 1931; 1935 saw Empire development and proposals for the establishment of an Empire Development Board.

In 1936 Hadfield presented to the Institution of Civil Engineers a paper in which he detailed the corrosive effect of sea-water on 980 metals.

Between 1898 and 1939 he lived at Parkhead House in Whirlow, Sheffield.

In the 1930s he employed record breaking motorcyclist Florence Blenkiron as a secretary and office manager.

He died 30 September 1940 in Surrey with over 200 papers to his name on metallurgical research.

== Honours ==
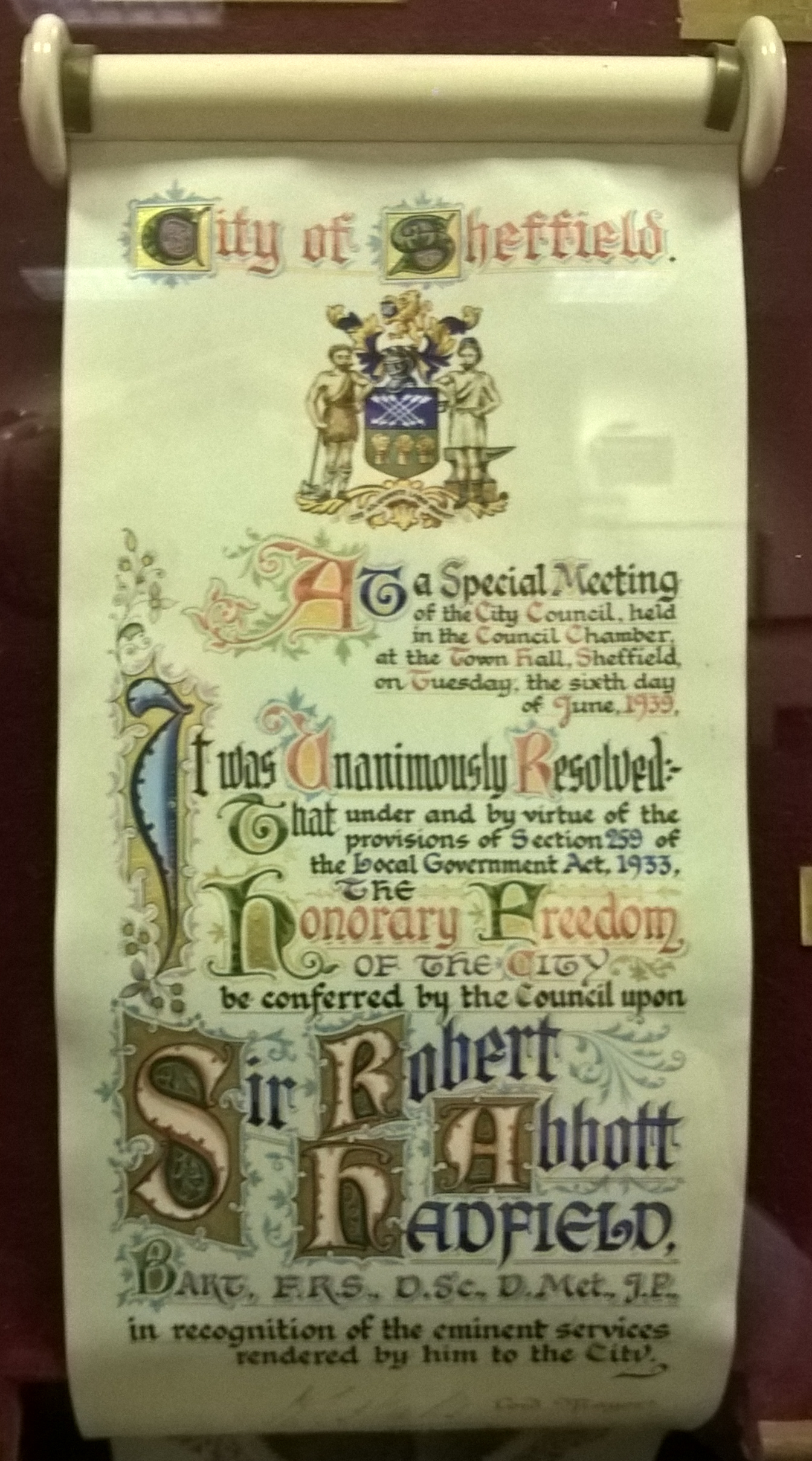
Freedom of the City

In 1899, Hadfield was made Master Cutler. He was knighted on 21 July 1908 and created a baronet, of Sheffield in the West Riding of the County of York on 26 June 1917. In the same year he was made a freeman of the City of London. He was elected as a Fellow of the Royal Society in 1909, a member of the Royal Swedish Academy of Sciences in 1912 and an honorary member of the Academy of Sciences of the USSR in 1933. He was also a corresponding member of the Académie Française. In 1939 he was awarded the Freedom of the City of Sheffield. He was an active Freemason and a member of Ivanhoe Lodge meeting at Tapton Hall in Sheffield.

He was awarded a Telford Medal by the Institution of Civil Engineers in 1888, the John Scott Medal of The Franklin Institute in 1891 and the Bessemer Gold Medal in 1904. He received the John Fritz Medal in 1921 and the Albert Medal (RSA) in 1935, both for his contributions to metallurgy.

Hadfield was awarded honorary degrees from the University of Oxford, the University of Sheffield and the University of Leeds.

He is commemorated in the Sir Robert Hadfield Building at the University of Sheffield, which contains the Departments of Materials Science and Engineering and Chemical and Biological Engineering. There is also a wing at Sheffield's Northern General Hospital named after him.

He was nominated for the Nobel Prize in physics in 1912.

== Family ==
Hadfield married in 1894 Miss Frances Belt Wickersham, of Philadelphia, who earned a CBE in 1918 for her services in World War I as the founder of a hospital at Wimereux. At the beginning of the Second World War she founded the Hadfield-Spears Ambulance Unit, again in that country.

Baronetage of the United Kingdom
New creation	Baronet (of Sheffield); 1917–1940	Extinct
