= South Wales Institute of Engineers =

Engineer learned society in Wales

South Wales Institute of Engineers Educational Trust
- Founded: 1857
- Type: registered charity
- Location: Cardiff
- Region served: South Wales
- Website: http://www.swieet2007.org.uk/default.asp

South Wales Institute of Engineers was founded in 1857 as a learned society for engineers and scientists in the area, arranging lectures and publishing the Proceedings of the South Wales Institute of Engineers. William Menelaus founded the organisation at a meeting at the Castle Hotel, Merthyr, and became its first president. In 2007, the body was re-constituted as South Wales Institute of Engineers Educational Trust 2007 (SWIEET2007).

Amongst eminent presidents was Edmund Mills Hann who was also only the second recipient of the institute's Gold Medal which was established in 1904.
