= Floris Osmond =

French scientist and engineer (1849–1912)

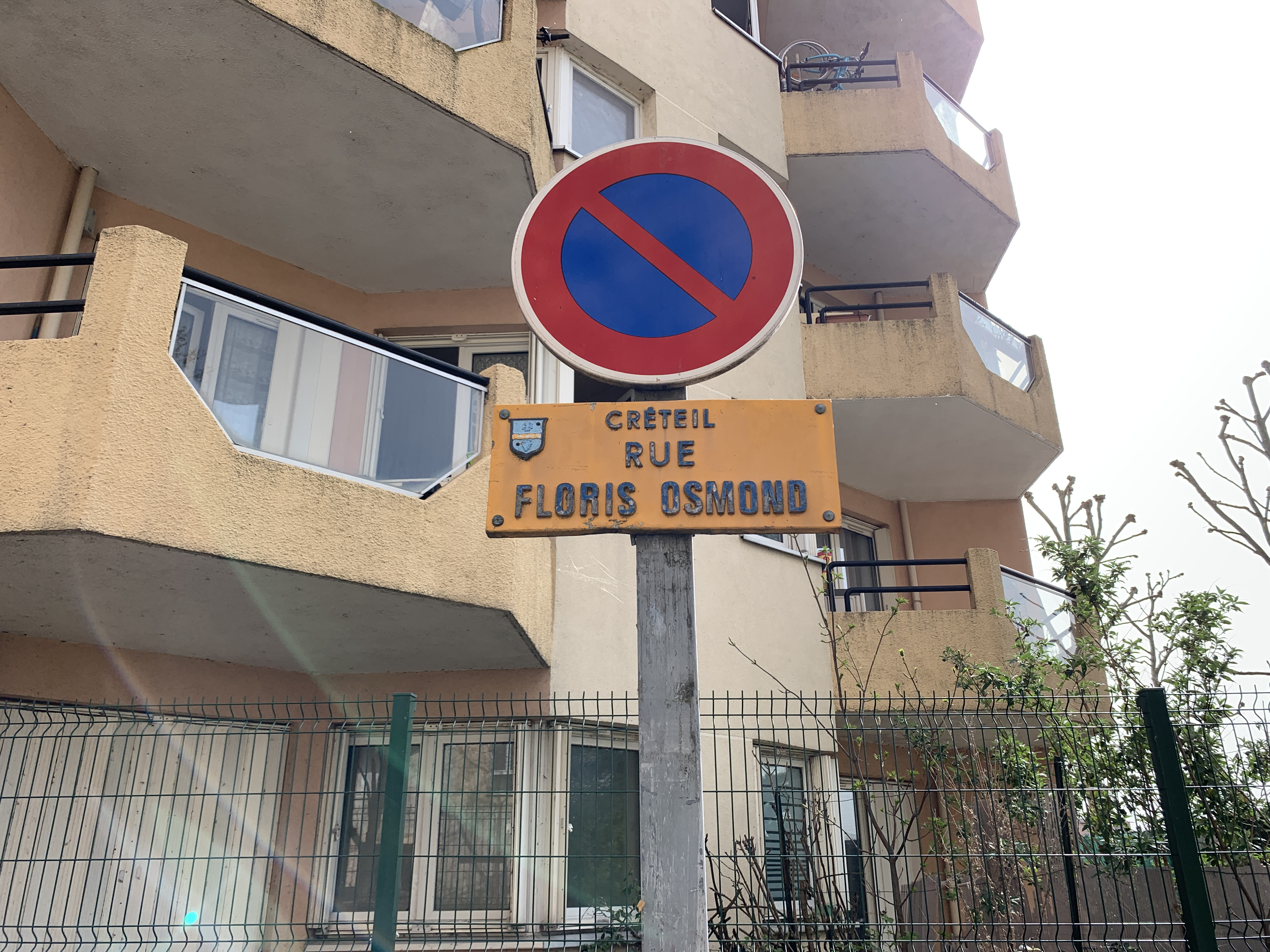
Plaque Rue Floris Osmond - Créteil, France

Floris Osmond (10 March 1849 – 18 June 1912) was a French scientist and engineer. He is known as one of the originators of metallography. He named several phases that occur in iron and steel microstructures such as martensite, after A. Martens, and cementite. He also provided the symbols α,β,γ and δ for the steel phases.

A list of publications was published shortly after his death.
