= William Menelaus =

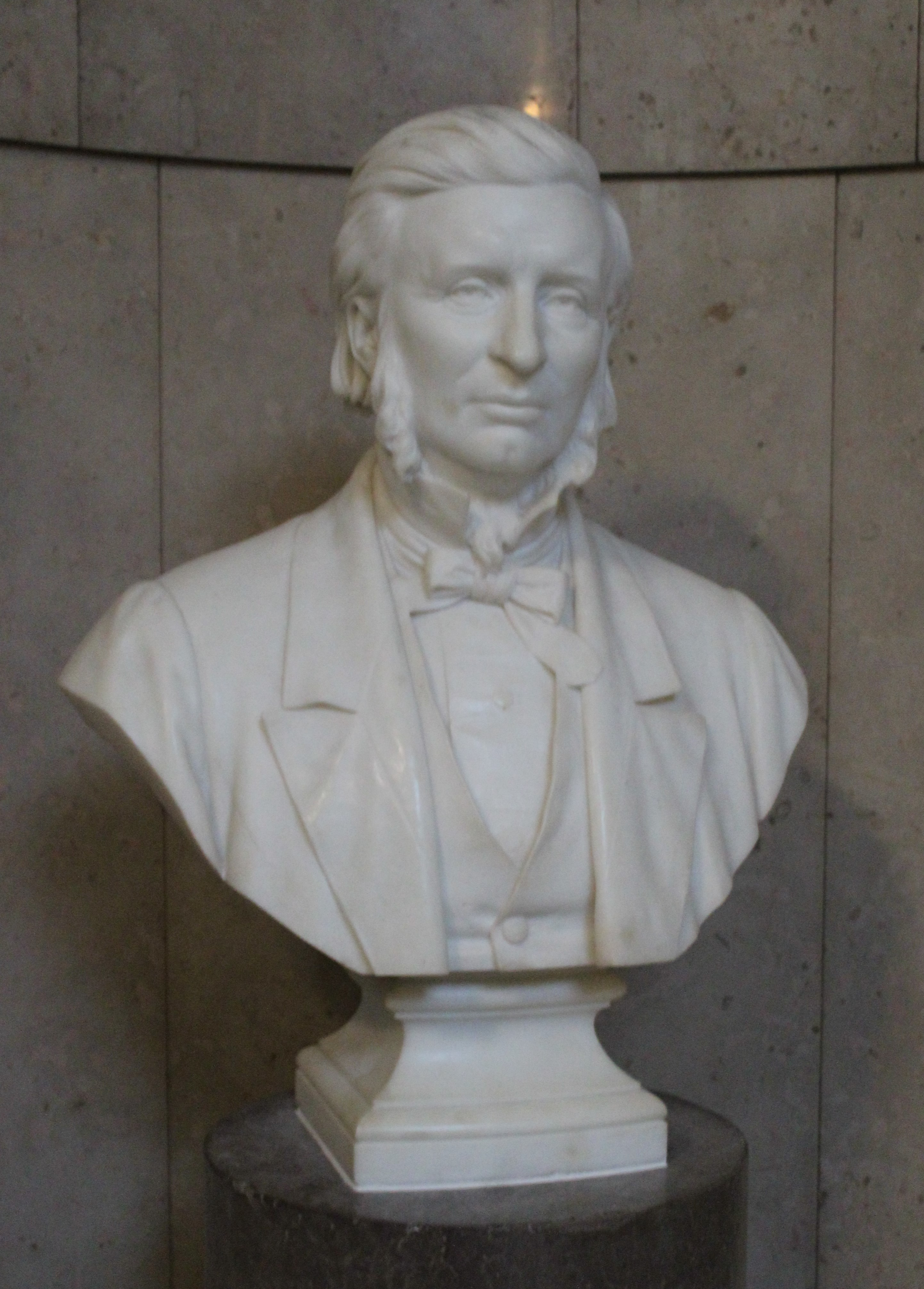
- Bust of Menelaus, 1884, by Thomas Brock, National Museum Cardiff
- Born: 10 March 1818; East Lothian, Scotland
- Died: 30 March 1882 (aged 64); Tenby, Pembrokeshire, Wales
- Resting place: Penderyn churchyard, Rhondda Cynon Taf
- Citizenship: British
- Spouse: Margaret Janet Rhys (26 August 1852 – her death 10 weeks later)
- Engineering career
- Discipline: Mechanical engineering, Ironmaster
- Institutions: Institution of Civil Engineers; Iron and Steel Institute
- Employer(s): Rowland Fothergill; Sir John Guest
- Projects: Dowlais Ironworks
- Awards: 1881: Bessemer Gold Medal

William Menelaus (10 March 1818 – 30 March 1882) was a Scottish-born mechanical engineer, who made his name and fortune as the works manager at the Dowlais Ironworks in South Wales.

== Early life ==
Born in East Lothian on 10 March 1818, his father was a writer to the Society of Writers to Her Majesty's Signet in Edinburgh. Educated locally, he was an apprenticed millwright to a group of engineers at Haddington.

== Career ==
In 1844 Rowland Fothergill of Hensol Castle engaged Menelaus to remodel a corn mill. Persuading him to stay, Menelaus rose to manage Fothergill's Aberdare Ironworks at Llwydcoed.

=== Dowlais Ironworks (1851–1884) ===
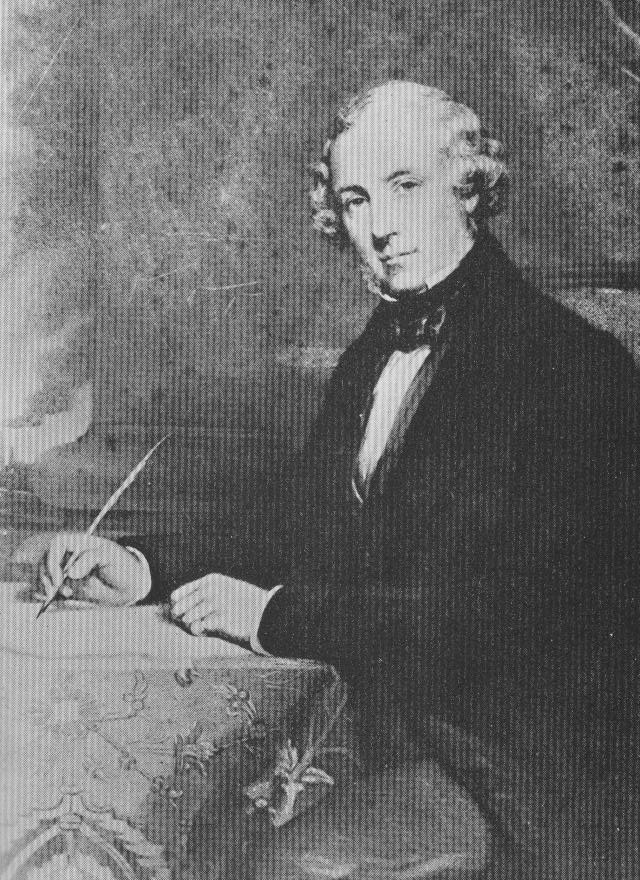
Sir Josiah John Guest

After the death of Thomas Guest died in 1807, his son John Josiah Guest became sole manager of the Dowlais Ironworks, by 1815 owning nine of the sixteen shares. His brother Thomas Revel Guest owned one and Whyndham Lewis, the remaining six. In 1835 Guest made the acquaintance of engineer G. T. Clark, who had both had been involved in the Taff Vale Railway. In 1850, Clark married Ann Price Lewis (died 1885), a descendant of Thomas Lewis. Ann's brother had sold her family's last remaining interests in the firm that year, to Guest.

Having become sole owner, in 1851 Guest offered to double Menelaus's salary to £600pa to join the new management team. However, Guest died in 1852, and was buried at St. John's church in Dowlais. Guest named Clark, his widow Lady Charlotte Guest and Edward Divett as executors and trustees. Lady Guest would be sole trustee while a widow but she remarried in 1855 and de facto control fell to Clark. Henry Bruce, later to become Lord Aberdare, replaced Divett.

For some time, the works had been in decline. The renewal of the lease had taken from 1840 to 1848, by which time Sir John Guest was starting a long and declining period of illness that would eventually lead to his death. Under the control of Lady Guest, the works had been in further and steeper decline. Clark resultantly took rapid steps to improve management controls.

Clark became managing director looking after overall strategy, while he appointed Menelaus head of operational control. A student of modern management methods, Menelaus insisted on weekly reports on physical and financial performance from all departments, and took daily walks through the works. Clark and Menelaus based all of their decisions on long-run considerations: the spurning of short-run profit maximisation in favour of investment for long-run growth infused their magisterial 1857 report on the state of the Dowlais works. Resultantly, Dowlais again became a centre of innovation, and thrived with its new cost-effective production methods. Though the Bessemer process was licensed in 1856, nine years of detailed planning and project management were needed before the first steel was produced:

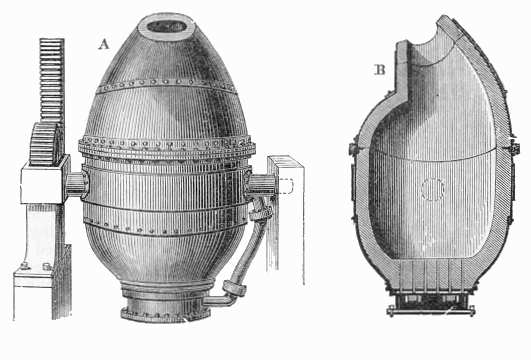
Bessemer converter

- 1857: constructed the "Goat Mill", the world's most powerful rolling mill.
- 1861: the company entered the coal trade
- 1863: after recovery from a business slump, the company had no cash to invest for a new blast furnace, despite having made a profit. To explain why there were no funds to invest, the Clark and Menelaus made a new financial statement that was called a comparison balance sheet, which showed that the company was holding too much inventory. This new financial statement was the genesis of Cash Flow Statement that is used today.
- 1864: ownership passed to Sir Ivor Guest
- 1870: the works consisted of six Bessemer converters and four Siemens open-hearth furnaces

Menelaus innovated in production systems and methodologies. He used small coal, a waste product, in the furnaces, releasing the large coal for sale as steam coal. He also scientifically demonstrated that old worn-out furnaces were merely destroying fuel. In 1870 Dowlais was first ironworks to use the waste gas from the coking ovens to fuel the furnaces.

With local supplies of iron ore depleting, all of the South Wales ironworks became highly dependent on transport systems. The Dowlais ironworks site was located 1,000 feet (300 m) above sea level, and so required excellent transport connections to remain profitable and competitive. As a result, Clark and Menelaus drove railway development, connecting Dowlais to the docks at Cardiff, Barry, Newport and Swansea. They also built a new small steel plant within Cardiff Docks.

In October 1871, Menelaus travelled to Spain to negotiate a long-run source of cheaper ores. This resulted in the formation of the Orcenario Iron Ore Company in 1873, an alliance company jointly owned by Dowlais, the Consett Iron Company and Krupp. The result was that while other South Wales-based ironworks failed or slid into decline during the same period, including the Crawshays of Cyfarthfa Ironworks, Dowlais profits between 1863 and 1882 averaged nearly £120,000pa.

Clark formally retired in 1897.

== Professional activities ==
Unlike many successful Victorian-era business people, Menelaus was not very active in civic life, but focused his attentions of development of his chosen profession. In 1857 he facilitated the meeting at the Castle Hotel, Merthyr, which led to the foundation of the South Wales Institute of Engineers, of which he was the first president. In 1886, he chaired the meeting at the Queen's Hotel, Birmingham, which led to the founding of the Iron and Steel Institute, and was its president from 1875 to 1877. In 1881 Menelaus was awarded the Bessemer Gold Medal.

The annual William Menelaus Memorial Lecture, which started in 1950, is jointly sponsored by the South Wales Institute of Engineers and the Learned Society of Wales.

== Personal life ==
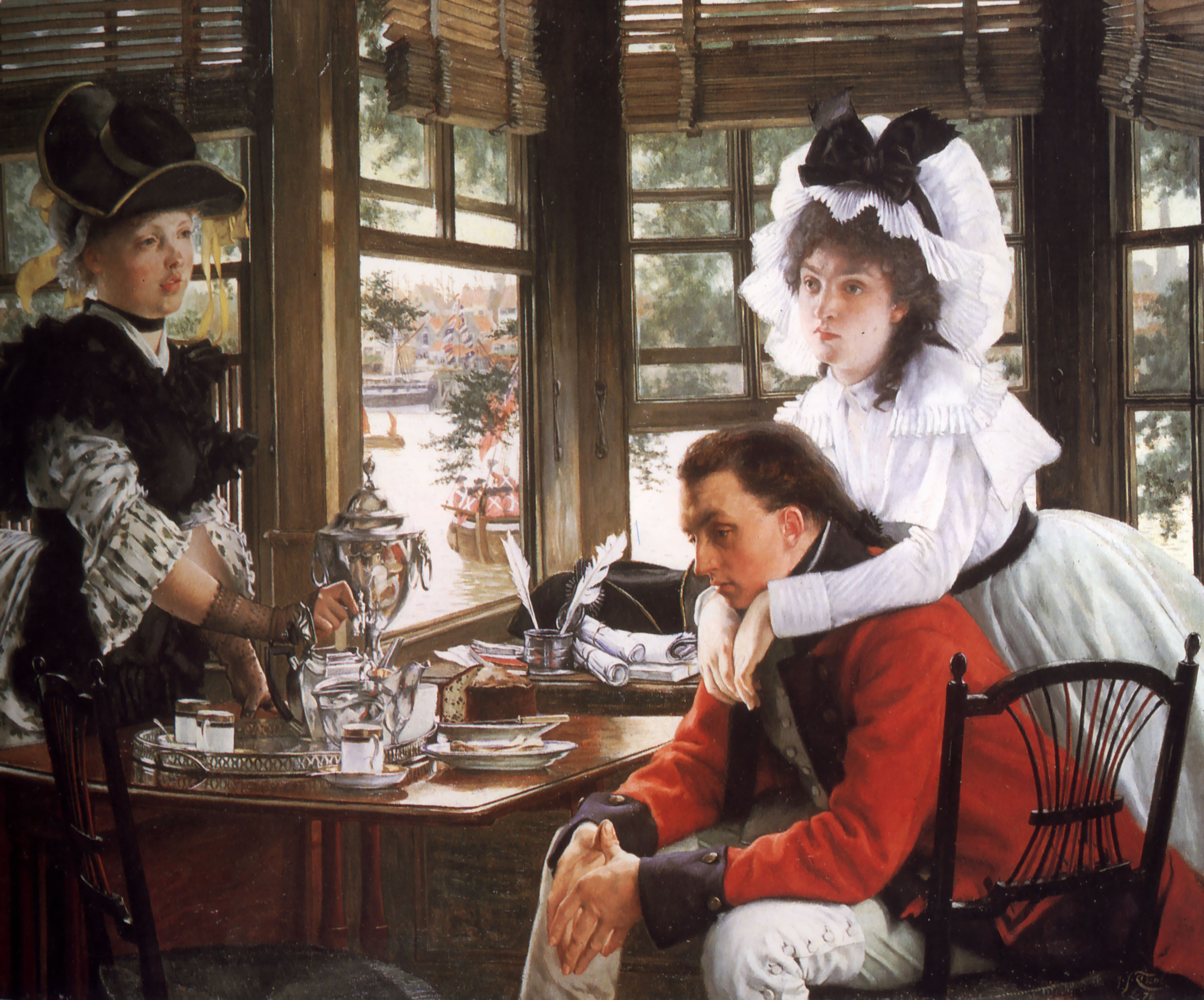
The Parting (Bad News) (oil on canvas) by French artist James Tissot from 1872, donated by William Menelaus to the Cardiff Free Library, now hanging in the National Museum Cardiff

Menelaus married Margaret Janet Rhys, the second daughter of Jenkin Rhys of the Llwydcoed ironworks, on 26 August 1852 in Aberdare. Unfortunately, she died ten weeks later in November 1852 of cholera. Menelaus did not remarry, but brought up and educated two nephews: William Darling, who became a law lord, and Charles Darling, who became an MP and later a baron.

Although paid well from his work at Dowlais and investments in other steel, coal and commercial activities, Menelaus lived a simple lifestyle at his home in Merthyr Tydfil. His only extravagance was his art collection, which included works by many of the modern and noted European artists.

Menelaus died on 30 March 1882 at Charlton House, in Tenby. Having previously given artworks to the Cardiff Free Library, he left the residual 36 pieces valued at £10,000 to the same institution. Today they are all part of the Welsh National art collection, and mainly hang in the National Museum Cardiff, although his portrait by Parker Hagarty is on loan to Cardiff University's engineering department. Menelaus was buried on 4 April 1882 in the churchyard at Penderyn, Rhondda Cynon Taf, in the same brick grave that had already held his wife for thirty years.
