= Iron and Steel Institute =

British trade association from 1869 to 1974

The Iron and Steel Institute was a British association originally organized by the iron trade of the north of England. Its object was the discussion of practical and scientific questions connected with the manufacture of iron and steel.

== History ==
The first meeting of the institute took place in London, February 25, 1869. There were two general meetings each year, one in May, in London, and one in autumn in other cities, not always in Great Britain, for the institute has met in Paris, Vienna, Brussels, Düsseldorf and New York. Beginning in 1874 it annually presented the Bessemer Gold Medal, for some invention or notable paper.

The institute published the semi-annual Journal of the Iron and Steel Institute, containing original papers and abstracts from other publications.

In 1974, the Iron and Steel Institute merged into the Institute of Metals. The Institute of Metals then merged in 1993 with the Institute of Ceramics and the Plastics and Rubber Institute to form the Institute of Materials (IoM). The IoM and the Institution of Mining and Metallurgy merged in June 2002, becoming the Institute of Materials, Minerals and Mining.

== Presidents ==
Presidents of the institute were:

- 1869-71 William Cavendish, 7th Duke of Devonshire
- 1871-73 Sir Henry Bessemer
- 1873-75 Sir Lowthian Bell Bt FRS
- 1875-77 William Menelaus
- 1877-79 Sir C William Siemens FRS
- 1879-81 Edward Williams
- 1881-83 Josiah Timmis Smith
- 1883-85 Rt Hon Sir Bernard Samuelson Bt FRS
- 1885-87 John Percy MD FRS
- 1887-89 Daniel Adamson
- 1889-91 The Rt Hon Lord Airedale of Gledhow DSc
- 1891-93 Sir Frederick Augustus Abel Bt GVCO KCB FRS
- 1893-95 Edward Windsor Richards
- 1895-97 Sir David Dale Bt DCL
- 1897-99 Edward Pritchard Martin
- 1899-1901 Sir William Chandler Roberts-Austen KCB DCL FRS
- 1901-03 William Whitwell
- 1903-05 Andrew Carnegie LLD
- 1905-07 Sir Robert Abbott Hadfield Bt DSc FRS
- 1907-10 Sir Hugh Bell Bt CD DCL LLD
- 1910-12 Victor Cavendish, 9th Duke of Devonshire KG
- 1912-14 Arthur Cooper LLD
- 1914-15 Adolphe Greiner DSc
- 1916-18 Rt Hon Lord Invernairn of Strathnairn
- 1918-20 C P Eugene Schneider DSc
- 1920-22 John Edward Stead DSc DMet FRS
- 1922-24 Francis Samuelson
- 1924-25 Sir William Ellis GBE DENG
- 1925-26 Sir Frederick Mills Bt DL
- 1926-27 Sir W Peter Rylands JP
- 1927-28 Frank William Harbord CBE
- 1928-29 Benjamin Talbot
- 1929-31 Henry Louis MA DSc
- 1931-33 Col Sir W Charles Wright Bt KBE CB
- 1933-35 William R Lysaght CBE
- 1935-37 Sir Harold Carpenter FRS
- 1937-38 Alfred Hutchinson MA
- 1938-40 The Rt Hon The Earl of Dudley DC
- 1940-42 Sir John Craig CBE DL
- 1942-44 James Henderson
- 1944-46 Arthur Dorman
- 1946-48 Dr Cecil Henry Desch DSc PhD LLD FRS
- 1948-50 Sir Andrew McCance LLD DSc FRS
- 1950-51 James Robert Menzies-Wilson OBE
- 1951-52 Richard Mather BMet
- 1952-53 Captain Hector Leighton Davies CBE JP
- 1953-54 James Mitchell CBE
- 1954-55 The Hon Richard Glynne Lyttelton
- 1955-56 Sir Charles Bruce-Gardner Bt
- 1956-57 Herbert Henry Burton CBE DMet
- 1957-58 Arnold Hugo Ingen-Housz
- 1958-59 Charles Reginald Wheeler CBE
- 1959-60 William Barr OBE
- 1960-61 William Frederick Cartwright DL
- 1961-62 Sir Charles Goodeve OBE DSc FRS
- 1962-63 Maurice Alberic Fiennes
- 1963-64 Frank Bernard George
- 1964-65 Frank Henry Saniter OBE DSc (Tech) BENG
- 1965-66 William Frederick Gilbertson
- 1966-67 Sir Douglas Bruce-Gardner Bt
- 1967-68 Norman E Jones CMG DSc ASTC
- 1968-69 Dr John Hugh Chesters OBE FRS
- 1969-70 Niall Campbell Macdiarmid
- 1970-71 Norman Cecil Lake CBE
- 1971-72 Thomas Rae Craig CBE TD
- 1972-73 Geoffrey Thomas Harris CBE
- 1973-74 Lionel Roger Price Pugh CRD DL

== Autumn Meetings ==
- 1869 Middlesbrough
- 1870 Merthyr Tydvil
- 1871 Dudley
- 1873 Belgium
- 1874 Barrow in Furness, Sep 1
- 1876 Leeds, Sep 18
- 1877 Newcastle-upon-Tyne, Sep 17
- 1879 Liverpool
- 1880 Dusseldorf
- 1884 Chester, Sep 23
- 1885 Glasgow, Sep 1
- 1886 London, Oct 6
- 1889 Paris
- 1890 New York
- 1891 London
- 1893 Darlington, Sep 26
- 1894 Belgium
- 1895 Birmingham, Aug 20
- 1896 Bilbao
- 1897 Cardiff
- 1898 Stockholm, Aug 26
- 1899 Manchester, Aug 15
- 1900 Paris, Sep 18
- 1901 Glasgow, Sep 3
- 1902 Dusseldorf, Sep 3
- 1903 Barrow in Furness, Sep 1
- 1904 America
- 1905 Sheffield, Sep 26
- 1907 Vienna, Sep 23
- 1908 Middlesbrough, Sep 28
- 1909 London
- 1910 Buxton
- 1911 London, Oct 5
- 1912 Leeds, Sep 30
- 1913 Brussels, Sep 1
- 1914 Paris & London
- 1920 Cardiff
- 1921 Paris, Sep 5
- 1922 York, Sep 5
- 1923 Milan, Sep 17
- 1924 London
- 1925 Birmingham, Sep 9
- 1927 Glasgow
- 1928 Bilbao
- 1929 Newcastle-upon-Tyne
- 1930 Mddlesbrough, Oct 6
- 1931 Swansea
- 1932 London
- 1933 Sheffield
- 1934 Belgium & Luxemburg
- 1935 Manchester
- 1936 Dusseldorf
- 1937 Middlesbrough

== See also ==
- Institute of Materials, Minerals and Mining
