= Elia Alba =

American multidisciplinary artist (born 1962)

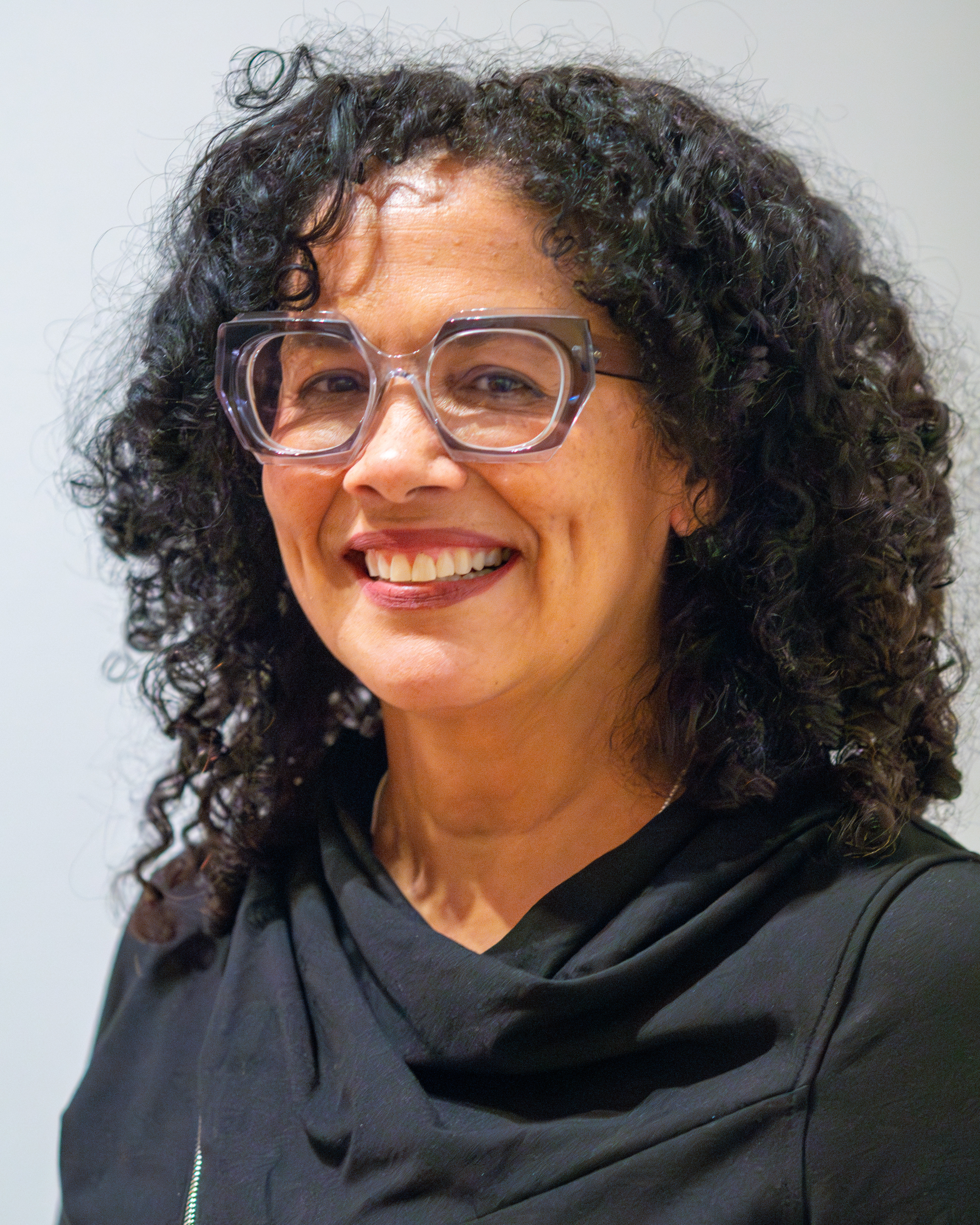
- Elia Alba in 2024
- Born: Elia Alba; 1962 (age 63–64); Brooklyn, New York
- Education: BA, Hunter College in 1994, Whitney Museum Independent Study Program in 2001
- Known for: Culture Critique, Photography, Sculpture
- Awards: Studio Museum in Harlem (1999), Whitney Museum Van Lier Foundation Fellowship Grant (2001), New York Foundation for the Arts Fellowship Grant – Crafts (2002), Pollock-Krasner Foundation Grant (2003), New York Foundation for the Arts Fellowship Grant – Photography (2008), Joan Mitchell Foundation Painters and Sculptors Grant (2008),
- Website: eliaalba.net

Elia Alba (born 1962 in Brooklyn, New York), is a multidisciplinary artist who lives and works in Queens, New York. Alba's ongoing project The Supper Club depicts contemporary artists of color in portraits, and presents dinners where a diverse array of artists, curators, historians and collectors address topics related to Latinx and Black people and to women from these groups.

== Early life and education ==
Born in Brooklyn in 1962, her family is from the Dominican Republic. In the late 1980s Alba began photographing her friend's small dance company which led to photographing other dance and opera companies throughout New York City. A few years after Alba began working on sculpture. She received a Bachelor of Arts degree from Hunter College in 1994 and completed the Whitney Museum Independent Study Program in 2001. That same year Alba produced works on the theme of identity and person-hood (e.g. "Doll-head, hand held").

== Photography ==
Elia Alba's work has been exhibited and screened at national and international institutions, including Yerba Buena Center for the Arts; El Museo del Barrio; The RISD Museum; Valencia Institute of Modern Art, IVAM, Spain; Stedelijk Museum, Amsterdam; ARCO, Madrid; Jersey City Museum; Science Museum, London; and ITAU Cultural Institute, São Paulo, Brazil, and the Havana Biennial.

In 1999 she began using photo transfer on fabric, creating body parts and masks that when staged in photography and video, play with notions of fantasy, surrealism, place, identity and gender. As often grotesque yet playful sculptures they present alternative realities and personas whose gestures and postures resist classification.

Alba began to do portraiture in 2012. In art historian Maurice Berger's continuing New York Times explorations of the relationship between race and photographic depiction of race, he outlines Alba's reimagining of artists of color as A-list celebrities, giving them a place of honor in a mainstream art world that continues to ignore or play down their accomplishments. He quotes Alba's own observation, "These portraits go beyond merely a record of the subject," and convey "a deeper meaning or vision of the sitter, through their art."

For these portraits Alba began by choosing an assortment of backdrops, props, and costumes that would accentuate the sitters' personae. These would subtly highlight the artist's contributions to the cultural landscape. In an interview with Jane Ursula Harris, Alba "didn't want to document the artists in a straightforward manner. [She] wanted to tell a story and make the artists into iconic archetypes that embody their persona and their practice...and connect them to the world."

Critic Naomi Lev wrote that Alba's pictures add a theatrical dimension to concepts of identity, blurring the hard boundaries of "difference" into something more slippery and beautiful. Seph Rodney devised different categories for all 60 portraits on view in at 8th Floor Gallery, New York City (December 2017) remarking that "One appreciates how Alba tenderly holds each of them up to a light, turning them this way and that to find what kinds of refractions best make them come to life."

== The Supper Club ==
The project began in 2012. On July 2, 2013, Alba launched The Supper Club on Recess Analog, a non-profit New York studio and exhibition organization. As of 2019 the seven-year project has brought together over 60 contemporary artists of color, along with a cross-section of collectors and scholars, for intimate dinners and portraiture. Over 25 dinners, have been attended in New York City, many personally prepared by Alba. She partnered with two different arts organizations in New York City to create the dinners where invited contemporary Black and Brown could lay down their burdens and engage in meaningful conversation about art, life, pop culture, politics and race.

While the portraits created visual meaning – and revised the overwhelming whitewashing of American culture in media – the dinners were where the actual lived experiences of these artists could come to the forefront and be transformed into meaningful social and cultural criticism. Initially invited as subjects of the portraits, the dinners began to be organized around invited hosts who would help to create the guest list, provide the prompts for discussion and guide the conversation.

In January 2019 the first venture in taking The Supper Club outside of New York City came to fruition as the University of Texas Department of Art & Art History hosted the entire portrait series and additional dinners were held in Austin. Also in 2019 with publication of the book, Elia Alba: The Supper Club (Shelley & Donald Rubin Foundation and Hirner Verlag), a unique historical documentation of African-American, Latin American, African, South Asian and Caribbean artists as a collective group was created.

Participating artists included: Abigail DeVille, Alejandro Guzman, Alex Rivera, Angel Otero, Arnaldo Morales, Brendan Fernandes, Carlos de Leon Sandoval, Chitra Ganesh, Clifford Owens, Coco Fusco, Dahlia Elsayed, David Antonio Cruz, Dawit Petros, Derrick Adams, Dread Scott, Firelei Báez, Hank Willis Thomas, Heather Hart, Ivan Monforte, Jacolby Satterwhite, Jaishri Abichandani, Janelle and Lisa Iglesias, Jaret Vadera, Jayson Keeling, Jeffrey Gibson, Juana Valdes, Kalup Linzy, Karina Skvirsky, Kenya Robinson, LaTasha Nevada Diggs, LaToya Ruby Frazier, Lina Puerta, Lorraine O'Grady, Marin Hassinger, Michael Paul Britto, Mickalene Thomas, Miguel Luciano, Nicolas Dumit Estevez, Nicole Awai, Niv Acosta, Paul Mpagi Sepuya, Rachelle Mozman, Rafael Sanchez, Rajkamal Kahlon, Dashawn Griffin, Rico Gatson, Sanford Biggers, Saya Woolfalk, Scherezade Garcia, Iliana Emilia Garcia, Shaun Leonardo, Shinique Smith, Simone Leigh, Steffani Jemison, Wangechi Mutu, Wanda Ortiz, and Zachary Fabri.[non-primary source needed]

Other guests included: Andrew Russeth, Ben Rodriguez-Cubeñas, Cameron Welsh, Cheto Castellano, Christopher Lew, E.Carmen Ramos, Edwin Ramoran, Legacy Russell, Elisabeth Smolarz, Emily Sufrin, Eva Díaz, Geandy Pavon, John Arthur Peetz, Juan Thompson, Lissette Olivares, Maris Curran, Nicole Caruth, Omar Lopez Chahoud, Sara Reisman, Saul Ostrow, Rocio Aranda-Alvarado, Yasmin Ramirez.[non-primary source needed]

== Disco reloaded ==
Elia Alba's participation in an art show titled "Do You Think I'm Disco" ignited a new interest in exploring disco DJs who paved the way for contemporary DJs. Using her own experiences in the 1980s as a club goer in New York City, she created the photo series "Larry Levan Live!" hoping to depict the relationship between DJs, the music, and the dancers. These pictures depict partygoers wearing masks with the face of Larry Levan during the period when disco held a strong influence and was nurtured by gay, black and Latino communities. She challenges the straightforward link between how a person looks and who they are regarding race, gender, and sexuality.

== Selected exhibitions ==
Elia Alba's artworks have been exhibited internationally at:

- Shelley & Donald Rubin Foundation, New York City, (2017)
- SVA Chelsea Gallery, New York City (2016)
- El Museo del Barrio, New York City (2015)
- Visual Art Center, University of Texas, Austin, TX (2014)
- Studio Museum in Harlem, New York, NY (2013)
- The Smithsonian American Art Museum, Washington DC (2013)
- Galleria Overfoto, Naples, IT (2010)
- 10th Havana Biannial, Havana, CU (2009)
- Black & White Gallery, New York City, NY (2009)
- Jersey City Museum, Downtown Jersey City, NJ (2003)
- Bernice Steinbaum Gallery, Miami, FL (2003)
- Joan Mitchell Foundation Painters and Sculptors Grant (2002)
- Museo de Arte Moderno, Dominican Republic (2002)
- Studio Museum in Harlem, New York, NY (1999)

== Awards and residencies ==
- Lower Manhattan Cultural Council (LMCC) Residency (2016)
- Flying Horse Editions (2011)
- New York Foundation for the Arts Fellowship Grant – Photography (2008)
- Pollock-Krasner Foundation Grant (2002)
- New York Foundation for the Arts Fellowship Grant – Crafts (2001)
- Joan Mitchell Foundation Painters and Sculptors Grant (2002)
- Whitney Museum Van Lier Foundation Fellowship Grant (2001)
- Studio Museum in Harlem, New York, NY (1989–1999).
