= Margaret Rose Vendryes =

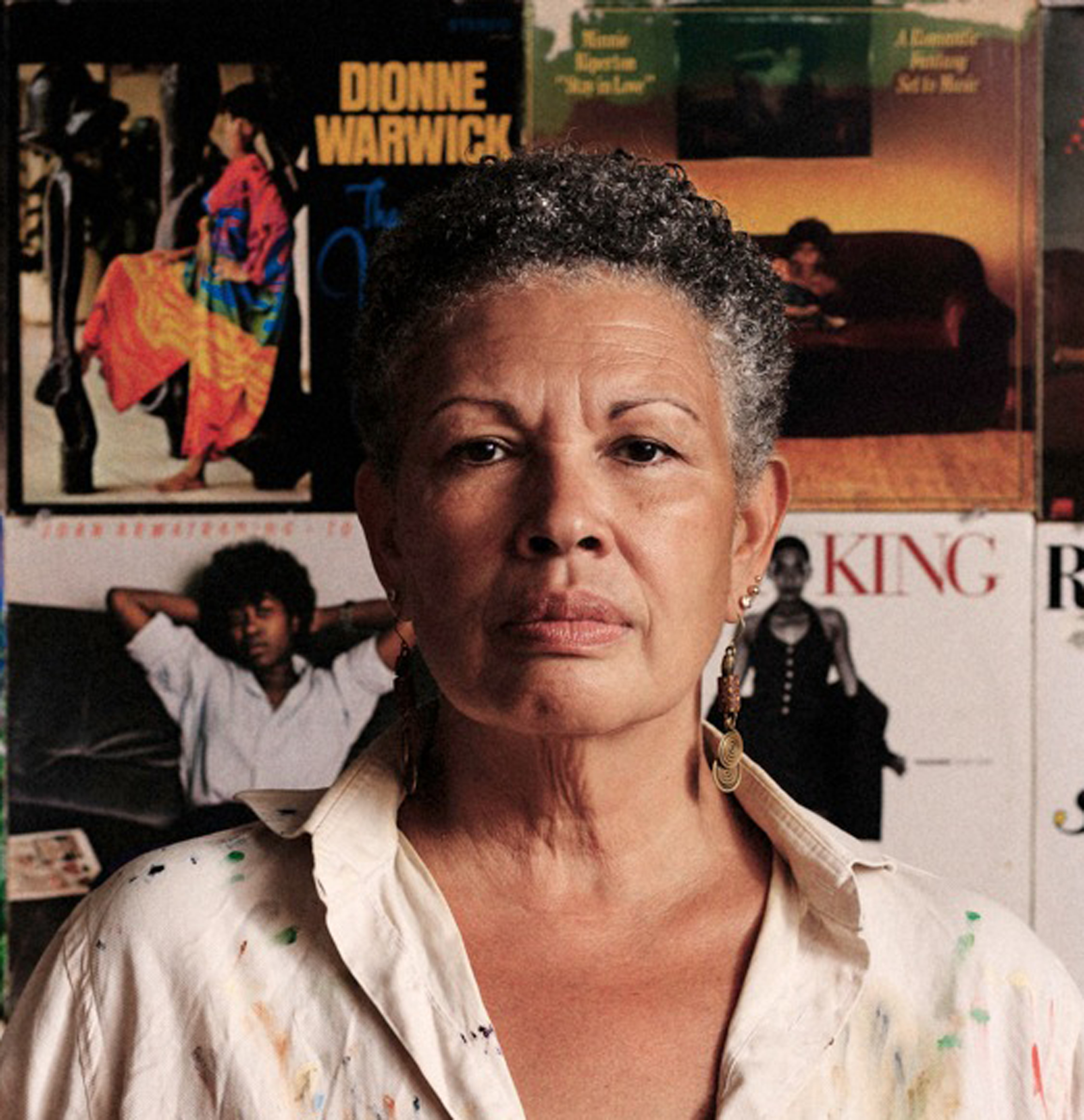
- Born: March 16, 1955; Kingston, Jamaica
- Died: March 29, 2022 (aged 67)
- Education: Princeton University
- Occupations: Curator, Educator
- Website: mrvendryes.com

Margaret Rose Vendryes (March 16, 1955 – March 29, 2022) was a visual artist, curator, and art historian based in New York.

== Early life and education ==
Vendryes was born on March 16, 1955, in Kingston, Jamaica. She began her studies in costume design before moving to fine art and earning a Bachelor's degree at Amherst College, graduating in 1984. She went on to earn her MA in Art History in 1992 from Tulane University and her PhD from Princeton University in 1997 where she focused on African American art history and was the first Black woman to earn a PhD in art history from Princeton.

== Career ==
Vendryes served as Chair of the Department of Performing and Fine Arts and Director of the Fine Arts Gallery at York College in New York where she began working in 2000. She was set to assume the role of Dean of the School of the Museum of Fine Arts at Tufts University in Boston in June 2022.

From 2000 to 2001 she worked as visiting lecturer for Art & Archaeology and African American Studies at Princeton University. She also worked as associate professor for Modern American and Contemporary Art at City University of New York from 2002 till 2007.

She warned against what she calls "the race-centered approach" to interpreting artwork, the practice of reading the influence of an artist's race into their artwork, as she believed it could limit the interpretation and context of the work and minimize the assessment of their impact on the larger art movements.

In 2009 Vendryes worked as lecturer for African Art at Boston University in Massachusetts.

In 2010 she curated an exhibition at the new Ohr-O’Keefe Museum of Art called, Richmond Barthé: The Seeker. She compared Barthe's work Blackberry Woman to Wallace Thurman's novel The Blacker The Berry... A Novel of Negro Life in her thesis dissertation and wrote about Barthe's work further in her 2008 book about his sculpture. That same year she curated an exhibition titled Beyond the Blues at New Orleans Museum of Art.

From 2011 to 2013 she was a lecturer for African & African American Art at Wellesley College in Massachusetts.

In 2013 Vendryes returned as Distinguished Lecturer in Fine Arts and Director of the York College Fine Arts Gallery at York College, CUNY.

In 2015 she gave the opening lecture for The Visual Blues, an exhibition with work from the Harlem Renaissance at the Jepson Center for the Arts.

== Artwork ==
In 2005 Vendryes began a series of multi-media works within her The African Diva Project, with oil and cold wax on canvas, and more recently, embedded African masks. The series began with a portrait of Donna Summer inspired by her Four Seasons of Love album cover. The imagery juxtaposes and combines portraits of Western pop culture icons with traditional African masks. Because these masks are traditionally worn only by men, she has noted her exploration of power, race, gender and beauty through these works. The project has included many Black American women icons including Aretha Franklin, Grace Jones, and Whitney Houston.

Schomburg Center for Research in Black Culture commissioned an artwork in 2014 from Vendryes for an exhibition celebrating the 40th anniversary of Ntozake Shange’s for colored girls who have considered suicide / when the rainbow is enuf called, My spirit is too ancient to understand the separation of soul & gender - Guro Ntozake. The exhibition, titled i found god in myself: the 40 anniversary of Ntozake Shange's for colored girls... and curated by Peter "Souleo" Wright, traveled to African American Museum in Philadelphia in 2016 and City Without Walls (cWOW) gallery in 2017 in Newark, New Jersey. The exhibition also featured artists Renée Cox, Carrie Mae Weems, Deborah Willis, Saya Woolfalk, Michael Paul Britto, Pamela Council and Dianne Smith among others.

== Death and legacy ==
Vendryes was a longtime board member of the Leslie Lohman Museum. Vendryes' death, on March 29, 2022, due to respiratory failure, was announced by the Southeast Queens Artists' Alliance.

Childs Gallery in Boston, with whom she had a long history, hosted a memorial exhibit in Vendryes' honor from November 2022-January 2023.

== Bibliography ==
- Vendryes, Margaret Rose; Barnett, Lauren; Lawson, R. A.; Lowe, John (2014). The Visual Blues. Baton Rouge, Louisiana: LSU Museum of Art. ISBN 9780615878300.
- Vendryes, Margaret Rose (2008). Barthé, A Life in Sculpture. Jackson, MS: University Press of Mississippi. ISBN 978-1604730920.
- Vendryes, Margaret Rose; Paschall, W. Douglass; Moore, Lewis Tanner; Holton, Curlee Raven (2008). In Search of Missing Masters: The Lewis Tanner Moore Collection of African American Art. Philadelphia, Pennsylvania: Woodmere Art Museum. ISBN 978-1888008227.
- Vendryes, Margaret Rose; Rosenblum, Robert; Hill Stoner, Joyce (2006). Factory Work: Warhol, Wyeth and Basquiat. Rockland, ME: Farnsworth. ISBN 0918749212.
- Sperath, Albert F.; Vendryes, Margaret R.; Jones, Steven H.; King, Eva F. (2000). The Art of Ellis Wilson. Lexington, KY: The University Press of Kentucky. ISBN 9780813160474.
- Willis, Deborah; Vendryes, Margaret Rose (2001). The Artist Portrait Series: Images of Contemporary African American Artist. Carbondale, IL: Southern Illinois University Press. ISBN 0809323796.
- Fossett, Judith Jackson (1997). Race Consciousness: Reinterpretations for the New Century. New York City: NYU Press. pp. Chapter 9. ASIN B00EIFPFE4.
- Vendryes, Margaret Rose (1997). Expression and Repression of Identity: Race, Religion, and Sexuality in the Art of American Sculptor Richmond Barthé. Princeton, NJ: Princeton University.
