= Ball-on-three-balls test =

Biaxial strength testing method

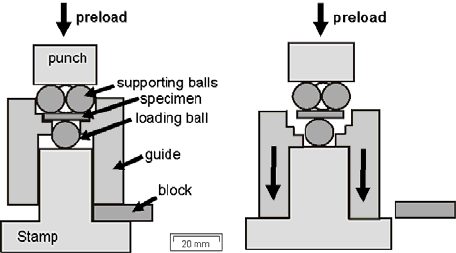
Sketch of the B3B test setup (specimen Ø 20 mm, loading ball Ø 13 mm) with preload applied, after guide ring is lowered.

The ball-on-three-balls test (B3B test) is a mechanical testing method for determining the biaxial strength of brittle materials. It involves placing a disc- or plate-shaped specimen on three supporting balls arranged in an equilateral triangle and applying a compressive force to the centre of the opposite face using a fourth ball. This setup produces a biaxial stress field that more closely simulates real-world multiaxial loading conditions compared to uniaxial tests, and it allows for testing of as-sintered or unpolished surfaces.

It is designed to simulate multiaxial stress conditions, offering a more application-relevant measure of strength than traditional uniaxial tests. Compared to conventional three- or four-point flexural tests, the B3B test offers several advantages, including reduced sensitivity to geometrical inaccuracies, minimal influence from edge defects, and low friction effects. These characteristics make it particularly suitable for testing small-sized specimens. Variations of the test were made, including the B3B-$K_\text{Ic}$ test and the three-balls-on-three-balls (3-on-3) test. They are particularly used in ceramic engineering, electroceramics and dental materials.

== History ==
Initial work on the ball-on-three-balls (B3B) test began in the 1980s and was subsequently expanded by Austrian materials scientist Andreas Börger et al. Earlier methods, such as the ring-on-ring (RoR) and ball-on-ring (BoR) tests, were already in use but were limited because of stress uniformity, specimen preparation, and the sensitivity to geometric imperfections like surface curvature or waviness. The B3B test configuration was introduced as a modification of the ball-on-ring setup, which supports the specimen with a continuous ring.

== Test method ==
The B3B test is a biaxial flexural strength testing method developed for brittle materials, such as ceramics and cementitious materials, in the form of discs or plates. The test is intended to replicate multiaxial stress states, providing strength measurements that more closely reflect real-world loading conditions compared to conventional uniaxial testing methods. In the B3B test, the specimen—typically a circular disc or a rectangular plate—is supported on its underside by three equally spaced spherical balls that form an equilateral triangle. The specimen is then loaded on the opposite side by a fourth ball, which is positioned centrally to the three supporting balls, transfers a compressive force to the centre of the opposite face. The four balls are typically of the same size. However, in certain applications, such as tests involving rectangular plates, the loading and supporting balls may differ in size. This symmetric configuration results in a biaxial stress field in the specimen, with the maximum tensile stress occurring at the centre of the upper surface of the disc.

The test is conducted by gradually increasing the load until the specimen fractures. Fixture designs often include radial grooves to position the support balls and centring pins or screws to align the specimen. A small preload (typically 10% of the expected fracture load) may be applied initially to stabilise the setup before loading begins. The B3B test is often compared to the Small Punch Test (SPT), as both methods are miniaturized test techniques used to evaluate the mechanical properties of brittle materials utilizing small, thin, disc-shaped specimens. While the SPT involves clamping the specimen and deforming it with a small punch, the B3B test offers a contact geometry that is more suitable for testing unmachined or as-sintered surfaces.

The test setup often includes precision alignment aids such as centring rings and a punch mechanism that transmits load from a mechanical testing machine. Components in contact with the specimen are usually made from high-purity aluminium oxide (Al_{2}O_{3}), providing mechanical stability and chemical inertness during testing.

=== Procedure ===
Testing is typically performed under displacement control at a constant rate until the specimen fails. The load is recorded continuously using a load cell. From the critical load at fracture, the maximum tensile stress can be calculated using analytical equations or finite element models.

High-temperature testing is possible using furnaces capable of reaching 1,400–1,600 °C (2,550–2,910 °F). These furnaces are designed to provide a controlled inert atmosphere to prevent material degradation. An argon gas environment is often employed to prevent oxidation or decarburization during elevated-temperature tests.

== Stress analysis ==
The B3B test induces a multiaxial stress state, which is more representative of real-world conditions such as thermal shock or contact loading. The maximum principal tensile stress at the specimen centre is used to define the material's biaxial strength. For linear elastic discs, this stress ($\sigma_{max}$) is calculated using the equation:

$\sigma_{max} = \frac{F}{t^2} f$

where ${F}$ is the applied force, ${{t}}$ is the thickness of the specimen, and ${f}$ is a dimensionless geometry factor determined by finite element method (FEM). This factor depends on specimen and support geometry as well as the material's Poisson's ratio (ν). FEM has been extensively used to derive empirical formulae for stress evaluation across a wide range of materials and geometries.

The B3B test can be analyzed statistically, often using the Weibull distribution. This makes it possible to describe the size effect in brittle materials, where larger samples usually show lower strength because they are more likely to contain defects that lead to fracture. Because the stress field in the B3B test is non-uniform, equivalent stress criteria—such as the principle of independent action (PIA) or the maximum principal stress criterion—are used to interpret the data.

== Variations ==
=== B3B-K_{Ic} test ===
The B3B test can be adapted for fracture toughness ($K_\text{Ic}$) testing by introducing a specimen that is supported by three equidistant balls and loaded on the opposite face by a fourth, centrally positioned ball. A semielliptical surface crack on the loaded face of the specimen. After applying a small preload, the load is increased until fracture, and the crack dimensions are analysed post-failure.

Conventional fracture toughness tests require relatively large specimens, which may be unsuitable for materials processed in small quantities or in thin geometries. The B3B-$K_\text{Ic}$ method addresses this limitation by using circular or rectangular plate specimens and integrating a precrack to enable linear elastic fracture mechanics (LEFM)-based evaluation. When combined with simulations (e.g., FEM or cohesive zone model), B3B results can be used to extract fracture toughness values and fit cohesive parameters by comparing simulated and experimental load–deflection curves.

The fracture toughness $K_\text{Ic}$ is calculated using the Griffith–Irwin equation:

$K_\text{Ic} = \sigma_{\mathrm{B3B}} \cdot {Y} \cdot \sqrt\pi{a}$

Here, $\sigma_{\mathrm{B3B}}$ is the maximum tensile stress from the B3B configuration, $a$ is the crack depth, and $Y$ is a dimensionless geometric factor derived via FEM. Because $Y$ varies and depends on specimen and crack geometry as well as the Poisson's ratio ν. For semicircular or semielliptical surface cracks, $Y$ varies along the crack front, and the maximum value $Y_{\mathrm{max}}$ is used for evaluating toughness. Calculated values for $Y_{\mathrm{max}}$ at various parameter combinations are available in the literature for ν = 0.3.

$\sigma_{\mathrm{B3B}}$ can be expressed by the empirical formula:

$\sigma_{\mathrm{B3B}} = \frac{F}{t^2} \cdot f\biggl(\frac{t}{R},\frac{R_\text{a}}{R},\nu\biggl)$

where the dimensionless factor ${f}$ accounts for the specimen's geometry through three dimensionless parameters: the thickness-to-radius ratio ($\frac{t}{R}$), the loading radius-to-specimen radius ratio ($\frac{R_\text{a}}{R}$), and the Poisson's ratio (ν). Although originally intended for circular discs, an effective specimen radius can also be calibrated for rectangular plates. The loading radius (${R_\text{a}}$) is determined by the ball diameter (${D_\text{B}}$) of the four balls, given as ${R_\text{a}} = \frac{D_\text{B}}\sqrt3$ . Accurate positioning of the crack is essential, as lateral misalignment can lead to significant overestimation of $K_\text{Ic}$. However, rotational misalignment has negligible effect on test results.

=== Three-balls-on-three-balls test ===
A modified three-balls-on-three-balls (3B3B) version uses three balls for both the loading and supporting forces. This variant of the test was patented in 2004 to expand the effective high-stress region on the specimen surface, addressing one of the limitations of the original B3B setup.

For a specific case where the loading and supporting balls are aligned and the disk geometry has a radius ratio $\frac{R}{R_1} = 2.25$, the maximum principal stress $\sigma_{\text{max},1}$ can be estimated using the following empirical relation derived from finite element analysis:

$\sigma_{\text{max},1} \frac{t^2}{F} = 0.656 \left( \frac{t}{R_1} \right)^{-0.196} + 0.274 \left( \frac{t}{R_1} \right)^{-0.448}\nu$

Here, ${F}$ is the applied force, $t$ the specimen thickness, $R$ the specimen radius, and ν the Poisson's ratio. The expressions $\left( \frac{t}{R_1} \right)$ serve as a dimensionless geometric factor specific to the 3B3B arrangement and highlights the reduced stress concentration resulting from load distribution across three points.

The three-on-three configuration may also vary in terms of alignment, with some designs positioning the loading and supporting balls directly in line and others offset by angular displacements such as 60 degrees. FEM has been used to analyse stress states in this variation, which has shown significantly reduced maximum principal stresses for the same total load compared to the one-on-three B3B test.

== Applications ==
The B3B test and its variations are widely used for evaluating the strength and toughness of brittle materials, including:

- Ceramic engineering (e.g., alumina, silicon nitride)
- Electroceramics (e.g., zinc oxide varistors)
- Dental materials (e.g., CAD/CAM restorative blocks)

Its tolerance for surface roughness and geometric imperfections makes it well-suited for as-sintered samples, providing a practical solution for industrial quality assurance and rapid screening.

== Bibliography ==
- Aneziris, Christos G.; Biermann, Horst (2024). Multifunctional Ceramic Filter Systems for Metal Melt Filtration. Springer Series in Materials Science. Vol. 337. Cham: Springer Nature. doi:10.1007/978-3-031-40930-1. ISBN 978-3-031-40930-1. ISSN 0933-033X – via the Internet Archive.
- Börger, Andreas; Supancic, Peter; Danzer, Robert (2002). "The ball on three balls test for strength testing of brittle discs: stress distribution in the disc". Journal of the European Ceramic Society. 22 (9–10): 1425–1436. doi:10.1016/S0955-2219(01)00458-7.
- Börger, Andreas; Supancic, Peter; Danzer, Robert (2004). "Biaxial Strength Test of Discs of Different Size Using the Ball on Three Balls Test". In Lara-Curzio, Edgar; Readey, Michael J. (eds.). 28th International Conference on Advanced Ceramics and Composites B. Ceramic Engineering and Science Proceedings. Vol. 25. Hoboken, NJ, USA: John Wiley & Sons, Inc. pp. 283–288. doi:10.1002/9780470291191.ch43. ISBN 978-0-470-29119-1.
- Danzer, Robert; et al. (2007). "The ball on three balls test—Strength and failure analysis of different materials". Journal of the European Ceramic Society. Refereed Reports IX Conference & Exhibition of the European Ceramic Society. 27 (2): 1481–1485. doi:10.1016/j.jeurceramsoc.2006.05.034. ISSN 0955-2219.
- Fett, T.; et al. (2007). "A 3-balls-on-3-balls strength test for ceramic disks". Journal of the European Ceramic Society. 27 (1): 1–12. doi:10.1016/j.jeurceramsoc.2006.02.033. ISSN 0947-8620.
- Fu, Tengfei; Weiss, W. Jason (3 March 2020). "The Ball-on-Three-Ball (B3B) Test – Application to Cement Paste and Mortar". Advances in Civil Engineering Materials. 9 (1): 128–142. doi:10.1520/ACEM20180070. ISSN 2379-1357.
- Harrer, Walter; et al. (2008). The Ball on Three Balls Test: Strength Testing of Specimens of Different Sizes and Geometries. Proceedings of the 10th International Conference of the European Ceramic Society. pp. 1271–1275. ISBN 978-3-87264-022-2.
- Lube, Tanja; Rasche, Stefan; Nindhia, Tjokorda Gde Tirta (2016). Lara-Curzio, E. (ed.). "A Fracture Toughness Test Using the Ball-on-Three-Balls Test". Journal of the American Ceramic Society. 99 (1): 249–256. doi:10.1111/jace.13842. ISSN 0002-7820.
- Rasche, Stefan; et al. (2014). "Determination of Strength and Fracture Toughness of Small Ceramic Discs Using the Small Punch Test and the Ball-on-three-balls Test". Procedia Materials Science. 20th European Conference on Fracture. 3: 961–966. doi:10.1016/j.mspro.2014.06.156. ISSN 2211-8128.
- Staudacher, Maximilian; et al. (2021). "Comparison of biaxial strength measured with the Ball-on-Three-Balls- and the Ring-on-Ring-test". Open Ceramics. 6 100101. Elsevier BV. doi:10.1016/j.oceram.2021.100101. ISSN 2666-5395.
- Wendler, Michael; et al. (2017). "Chairside CAD/CAM materials. Part 2: Flexural strength testing". Dental Materials. 33 (1): 99–109. doi:10.1016/j.dental.2016.10.008. ISSN 0109-5641. PMID 27884403.
