= David Antonio Cruz =

- Born: 1974 (age 51–52); Philadelphia, Pennsylvania, U.S.
- Education: Yale University
- Website: DavidAntonioCruz.com

David Antonio Cruz (born 1974) is an interdisciplinary artist working in drawing, painting, video, and performance. Cruz is best known for his psychological paintings that combine figuration, abstraction, and collage. His work has been shown in a number of venues, including El Museo del Barrio, and the Smithsonian National Portrait Gallery, and has been awarded several fellowships. Cruz lives and works in New York City.

== Early life and education ==
Cruz is a Puerto Rican artist who was born in Philadelphia. At the age of nineteen, Cruz moved to Brooklyn, New York to attend Pratt Institute. He received his Bachelor of Fine Arts in Painting at Pratt in 1998. He went on to earn a Masters of Fine Art in Painting and Printmaking from Yale University. Cruz attended Skowhegan School for Painting and Sculpture and the AIM program at the Bronx Museum in 2006.

Cruz was brought up in a traditional Puerto Rican home. "Growing up, I was a very quiet boy, I kept to myself. I spent my time drawing, painting and making things. Paint was the most natural way I could really express myself. I didn't feel conformable speaking or writing."

"As far I can remember, I don't think there was a moment that I didn't consider myself an artist. It's all I can remember. I remember in elementary school, I would spend my recess time in the art room. Once, I slipped out of class early to head to the art room and my home room teacher caught me. She gave me the ultimate punishment by making me go outside to play. It was terrifying! She knew me well."

In Philadelphia and New York, his identity was never contested, but, during his first exhibit in Puerto Rico, David was talked about as a "foreign" artist. It totally took him by surprise. "I felt like I didn't belong here nor there."

== Career ==
Cruz not only pushes the limits of his artistic media, but also the ways artists can represent psychological spaces related to migration. Cruz's work represents the life of those migrating families that either left their homeland, stayed, or went back and are divided between two places.

In his practice, he fuses video, fashion, performance, and painting to explore and redefine queerness, diasporic, psychological, and ever-shifting unnamed spaces. His paintings have been exhibited at El Museo del Barrio, the Bronx Museum of the Arts, Jersey City Museum, Museo de Puerto Rico, and various galleries. He has also shown at Lehmann Maupin, the Islip Art Museum, Momenta Art, and Performa 13. He was the 2015 Resident at Gateway Project Spaces. His films have been shown at the Big Screen Project, the Anthology Film Archives, Arte Americas, El Museo del Barrio, and various installations in Philadelphia, Chapel Hill, Los Angeles, and Miami.

Cruz was commissioned by El Museo del Barrio with support from the Franklin Furnace Fund to create The Opera. The project was presented as part of Performa 13, and it involved thirty performers, including ten actors, an opera singer, a jazz singer, and a small orchestra. The artists Elia Alba and Mickalene Thomas were also part of the performance. The work, like the artist, has an emotional intensity. Cruz has said, "I am a bit of a drama queen and I'm not apologizing for it." Sasha Dees, reviewing for ARC Magazine, said, "It's a lot to take in, at times confusing at first glance. Broken plates, hidden images behind thick dripping chocolate and white paint, fragile paper planes, chairs, period piece costumes, and splinters of glass in sparkling red high heel shoes are paired with screams, opera singing, and hysterical laughter. A second commission by the Bronx Council on the Arts to re-stage the performance, The Piano Piece (originally performed in 2008 at the Governor's School for the Arts in Norfolk, Virginia), for the Longwood Art Gallery followed up this project in 2014.

Later that year, his paintings were included in a year-long exhibition, Portraiture Now: Staging The Self, at the Smithsonian National Portrait Gallery in Washington D.C.

Cruz "use[s] painting, video, sculpture, and costume-making to map out a queer, diasporic experience", usually a narrative "that has been suppressed" when discussing "Puerto Rican migration". He wrote, "Through a variety of new and found materials, such as enamel, gold-leaf, china, constructed costumes and rags, I layer my paintings and build up their surfaces in an attempt to make visible the queer body, to dress it, and depict the space where it exists. Whether I layer sound over sound or cover a painted figure in chocolate paint, I use seduction to prompt the viewer to question and negotiate what is being offered while partially obscuring the familiar."

The artist cites "the fantasy world of Dorothy's Oz and the politics of Maria's West Side Story" stating that "personal narratives, American and queer history events, classic films, and fashion" anchor his work. In addition, he also "reinterpret[s] invisible histories" those of "a migrating people and the queer body".

His work has been reviewed many times in The New York Times, Time Out New York, The Wall Street Journal, Journal USA, The Studio, ARC Magazine, BOMB, and Centro Journal.

== Exhibitions and awards ==
- 2018 Joan Mitchell Foundation Painters and Sculptors Award
- 2018 BRICworkspace Residency, Brooklyn, NY
- 2016 Project for Empty Space Artist in Residence, Newark, NJ
- 2015 LMCC Workspace, New York, NY
- 2013 Franklin Furnace, New York, NY
- 2011 Urban Artist Initiative Award, New York, NY
- 2009 Yale Summer School of Art at Norfolk Fellowship Award, Norfolk, CT
- 2006 Skowhegan School of Painting and Sculpture Fellowship Grant Award, Madison, ME
- 2006 Artist in the Marketplace, Bronx Museum of the Arts, Bronx, NY
