= Magd Abdel Wahab =

Belgian academic

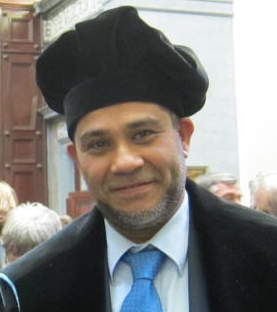
- Occupations: Academic, researcher, author and imam of islam
- Awards: Highly Ranked Scholar, Medal of honour, national orders award in recognition of outstanding teaching and professional activities, Belgium; SCEPTrE Fellowship award of University of Surrey

Academic background
- Education: BSc, Civil Engineering, Cairo University; MSc, Structural Mechanics, Cairo University; PhD, Fracture Mechanics, KU Leuven, Belgium; DSc, Aerospace and Mechanical Engineering, University of Surrey

Academic work
- Institutions: Ghent University

Magd Abdel Wahab is a Belgian academic, full professor, and chair of applied mechanics at Ghent University, distinguished professor at Yanshan University, China, and an honorary professor at Yuan Ze University in Taiwan. He is a researcher, author in computational mechanics, and a Imam of Islam. He is the head of the Applied Mechanics Research Group of Laboratory Soete, Editor-in-Chief of Journal of Sandwich Structures and Materials and Founding Editor (Former Editor-in-Chief) of Journal of Applied Mechanics (MDPI).

Wahab has published over 800 papers and technical reports in Solid Mechanics and Dynamics of Structures. He has been cited over 21000 times. His research interests include fatigue of materials, durability, damage mechanics, dynamics and vibration of structures, and fracture mechanics. He has authored the books Logic and Islam Part I: Faith issues: Answers to current questions; Logic and Islam Part II: Scientific issues; Mechanics of Adhesives in Composite and Metal Joints; Finite Elements In Fracture Mechanics and Dynamics and Vibration: An Introduction and has edited 25 books.

== Education ==
Wahab received his BSc in civil engineering in 1988 and his MSc in structural mechanics in 1991 from Cairo University, Egypt. In 1995, he completed his PhD in structural mechanics from KU Leuven, Belgium, and in 2008, he was awarded a Doctor of Science degree from the University of Surrey.

== Career ==
Wahab's academic appointments include being an Assistant lecturer of Finite Element Analysis at KU Leuven from 1995 to 1999. After that, he became a lecturer in Mechanical Engineering at the University of Surrey till 2003. From 2003 to 2008, he was a Senior Lecturer of Aerospace and Mechanical Engineering at University of Surrey. Then, at Xios University College Limburg, he was a professor of civil engineering until 2009. In 2009, he joined Ghent University, where he is currently a Full Professor.

== Research ==
Wahab's research focuses on finite element analysis, computational mechanics, fretting fatigue, fatigue of materials, durability, damage mechanics, fracture mechanics and dynamics and vibration of structures.

=== Computational mechanics ===
In a paper for nonlinear transient analysis of smart piezoelectric functionally graded material (FGM) plates, Wahab and his team presented a generalized shear deformation theory in combination with isogeometric (IGA) approach. Using the total Lagrange approach based on the von Kármán strains, a nonlinear transient formulation for plates is formed which includes thermo-piezoelectric effects, solved with the Newmark time integration scheme while the electrical potential through the thickness of each piezoelectric layer is assumed to be linear. According to the Mori-Tanaka schemes and the rule of mixture, the material properties vary through the thickness of FGM. To demonstrate the effectiveness of the proposed method, various numerical examples were presented. Using a novel numerical approach based on Isogeometric Analysis (IGA) and Higher order Shear Deformation Theory (HSDT), static, free vibration and dynamic control of piezoelectric composite plates integrated with sensors and actuators was investigated. The formulation fulfilled the high-continuity generalized displacements and the numerical studies showed good performance of the method used. Another study explored a new simple fur-unknown shear and normal deformation theory (sSNDT) for static, dynamic and buckling analyses of functionally graded material (FGM) isotropic and sandwich plates and in the relation between pain and stress, the fully three-dimensional material matrix is used. Through the Galerkin weak form, the discrete system of equations is derived and isogeometirc analysis (IGA) is used to numerically solve it. This required the C1-continuity of the displacement field and the condition is easily satisfied by the NURBS basis functions in IGA. Many examples are shown to illustrate the efficiency of the method used. To study the size dependent analysis of functionally graded carbon nano-reinforced composite (FG-CNTRC) nanoplates, a computational formulation was used based on IGA and generalized higher-order shear deformation theory (GHSDT). When compared to the other available numerical approaches used, the numerical results from this study prove high accuracy and reliability of this particular method. In another paper studying the size-dependent geometrically nonlinear transient analysis of functionally graded material (FGM) nanoplates, IGA integrated with high-order shear deformation theory (HSDT) was used. Wahab and his team investigated the effect of the resulting nonlocal approach on the behaviours of the FGM nanoplates with several volume fracture exponents and performed several numerical results to prove the reliability of the method used.

=== Fatigue of materials ===
Wahab and co-workers proposed and compared different techniques to derive dynamic bending stiffness of the experimentally determined modal characteristics of a reinforced concrete beam. As a result of the cracking of the reinforced concrete, there is degradation stiffness which provides information the severity and location of the damage that has taken place. They investigated the effect on the fatigue behaviour of CFRP/epoxy lap- strap joints by the test environment and pre-conditioning and it was found that the there was no significant variation observed in the fatigue resistance of the lap-strap until the glass transition temperature, Tg was approached, which is when a significant reduction in the fatigue threshold load could be seen. There is also a considerable reduction in the Tg of the adhesive because of the absorbed moisture and the locus of failure was observed to be highly temperature dependent. Another outcome was that the crack grew along the lap-strap joint, and the resolution of the forces at the crack tip had the tendency to force it into the strap adherend, possibly resulting in complex mixed mode fracture surfaces. In a paper, Wahab presented a literature review of articles published in the Web of Science from 1975 to 2011 on fatigue in adhesively bonded joints. There are about 222 cited articles reviewed and presented and the paper is concluded with highlighting topics important for future research.

=== Damage assessment ===
Wahab studied the effect of temperature variations on modal parameters recorded at two different times in a prestressed concrete highway bridge. To excite the bridge, a drop weight and ambient vibration were used and to support and verify the dynamic measurements, a finite element model was developed. The effect of the resulting changes in temperature were analysed and interpreted on the structure's natural frequencies. In an investigation of the long-term durability of adhesively bonded aluminium, composite and dissimilar substrate joints exposed to humid environments, the failure of the joints was modelled with a cohesive zone model (CZM) approach. In the dissimilar substrate joints, large residual stresses were induced because of the mismatch of coefficients of expansion of the substrates. The residual strength of the double lap joints was overestimated due to the predicted degradation which was possibly because of residual stress-enhanced degradation mechanism.

=== Islamic studies ===
Besides Wahab's research in engineering, he has conducted research in the Islamic religion. Over the past 20 years, he has been an Associate Imam and has also delivered Friday Ceremony speeches and Islamic talks in many mosques in the UK and Belgium. Wahab also authored the book Logic and Islam Part I: Faith issues: Answers to current questions. He authored a second book in this area Logic and Islam Part II: Scientific issues in 2020.

== Awards/honors ==
- 2025 – National Ranking #2 - AD Scientific Index Metallurgical & Materials Engineering
- 2025 – Leader Award – Research.com Mechanical and Aerospace Engineering
- 2025 – National Ranking #3 – Research.com Mechanical and Aerospace Engineering
- 2025 – World Ranking 229 – Research.com Mechanical and Aerospace Engineering
- 2024 – Listed among the top 2% of scientists worldwide by Stanford University and Elsevier
- 2024 – National Ranking #2 - ScholarGPS Engineering and Computer Science
- 2024 – Highly Ranked Scholars – ScholarGPS Engineering and Computer Science
- 2024 – Leader Award - Research.com Mechanical and Aerospace Engineering
- 2024 – National Ranking #3 - Research.com Mechanical and Aerospace Engineering
- 2024 – World Ranking 319 - Research.com Mechanical and Aerospace Engineering
- 2023 – Listed among the top 2% of scientists worldwide by Stanford University and Elsevier
- 2023 – Highly Ranked Scholars – ScholarGPS Engineering and Computer Science
- 2023 – Leader Award - Research.com Mechanical and Aerospace Engineering
- 2023 – National Ranking #3 - Research.com Mechanical and Aerospace Engineering
- 2023 – World Ranking 491 - Research.com Mechanical and Aerospace Engineering
- 2022 – Listed among the top 2% of scientists worldwide by Stanford University and Elsevier
- 2022 – Highly Ranked Scholars 2022 – ScholarGPS Engineering and Computer Science
- 2022 – High Level Foreign Talent in China
- 2021 – Listed among the top 2% of scientists worldwide by Stanford University and Elsevier
- 2015 – Medal of honour, national (Belgium) orders award in recognition of outstanding teaching and professional activities
- 2008 – Egyptian Society & Student Union award, University of Surrey, Guildford, Surrey, UK
- 2007 – SCEPTrE Fellowship award, The Surrey Centre for Excellence in Professional Training and Education
- 2005 – Teaching and Learning Prize, University of Surrey, UK

== Bibliography ==
=== Books ===
- Logic and Islam Part I: Faith issues: Answers to current questions (2019) ISBN 978-9463385824
- Logic and Islam Part II: Scientific issues (2020) ISBN 978-9463388580
- Mechanics of Adhesives in Composite and Metal Joints (2014) ISBN 978-1605950969
- Finite Elements in Fracture Mechanics (2010) ISBN 978-3838304014
- Dynamics and Vibration: An Introduction (2008) ISBN 978-0470723005

=== Selected articles ===
- Wahab, M. A., & De Roeck, G. (1999). Damage detection in bridges using modal curvatures: application to a real damage scenario. Journal of Sound and vibration, 226(2), 217–235.
- Loh, W. K., Crocombe, A. D., Wahab, M. A., & Ashcroft, I. A. (2005). Modelling anomalous moisture uptake, swelling and thermal characteristics of a rubber toughened epoxy adhesive. International journal of adhesion and adhesives, 25(1), 1–12.
- Khatir, S., Tiachacht, S., Le Thanh, C., Ghandourah, E., Mirjalili, S., Abdel Wahab, M. (2021). An improved Artificial Neural Network using Arithmetic Optimization Algorithm for damage assessment in FGM composite plates, Composite Structures 273, 114287.
- Phung-Van, P., Abdel-Wahab, M., Liew, K. M., Bordas, S. P. A., & Nguyen-Xuan, H. (2015). Isogeometric analysis of functionally graded carbon nanotube-reinforced composite plates using higher-order shear deformation theory. Composite structures, 123, 137–149.
- Nguyen, H. X., Nguyen, T. N., Abdel-Wahab, M., Bordas, S. P., Nguyen-Xuan, H., & Vo, T. P. (2017). A refined quasi-3D isogeometric analysis for functionally graded microplates based on the modified couple stress theory. Computer Methods in Applied Mechanics and Engineering, 313, 904–940.
