= Cohesive zone model =

Model in fracture mechanics

Cohesive zone fracture model

The cohesive zone model (CZM) is a model in fracture mechanics where fracture formation is regarded as a gradual phenomenon and separation of the crack surfaces takes place across an extended crack tip, or cohesive zone, and is resisted by cohesive tractions. The origin of this model can be traced back to the early sixties by Dugdale (1960) and Barenblatt (1962) to represent nonlinear processes located at the front of a pre-existent crack.

== Description ==
The major advantages of the CZM over the conventional methods in fracture mechanics like those including LEFM (Linear Elastic Fracture Mechanics), CTOD (Crack Tip open Displacement) are:

- It is able to adequately predict the behaviour of uncracked structures, including those with blunt notches.
- Size of non-linear zone need not be negligible in comparison with other dimensions of the cracked geometry in CZM, while in other conventional methods, it is not so.
- Even for brittle materials, the presence of an initial crack is needed for LEFM to be applicable.

Another important advantage of CZM falls in the conceptual framework for interfaces.

The Cohesive Zone Model does not represent any physical material, but describes the cohesive forces which occur when material elements are being pulled apart.

As the surfaces (known as cohesive surfaces) separate, traction first increases until a maximum is reached, and then subsequently reduces to zero which results in complete separation. The variation in traction in relation to displacement is plotted on a curve and is called the traction-displacement curve. The area under this curve is equal to the energy needed for separation. CZM maintains continuity conditions mathematically; despite physical separation. It eliminates singularity of stress and limits it to the cohesive strength of the material.

The traction-displacement curve gives the constitutive behavior of the fracture. For each material system, guidelines are to be formed and modelling is done individually. This is how the CZM works. The amount of fracture energy dissipated in the work region depends on the shape of the model considered. Also, the ratio between the maximum stress and the yield stress affects the length of the fracture process zone. The smaller the ratio, the longer is the process zone. The CZM allows the energy to flow into the fracture process zone, where a part of it is spent in the forward region and the rest in the wake region.

Thus, the CZM provides an effective methodology to study and simulate fracture in solids.

== Dugdale and Barenblatt models ==
=== Dugdale Model ===
The Dugdale model (named after Donald S. Dugdale) assumes thin plastic strips of length, $r_p$, (sometimes referred to as the strip yield model) are at the forefront of two Mode I crack tips in a thin elastic-perfectly plastic plate.

==== Plastic zone size ====
Derivation of Dugdale plastic zone through superposition
Dugdale's model can be derived using the complex stress functions, but is derived below using superposition.

A traction, $\sigma_{yy}$, exists along the plastic region and is equal to the yield stress, $\sigma_y$, of the material. This traction results in a negative stress intensity factor, $K''_I$.

$$K''_I = -\sigma_{y}\sqrt{\pi(a + r_p)} + 2\sigma_{y}\sqrt{\frac{a + r_p}{\pi}} \sin^{-1}\left(\frac{a}{a + r_p}\right)$$

If the traction were zero, a positive stress intensity factor, $K_I$, is produced assuming the plate is infinitely large.

$$K'_I = -\sigma^\infty\sqrt{\pi(a + r_p)}$$

For the stress to be bounded at $x = a + r_p$, the following is true through superposition: $K'_I + K''_I = 0$

The length of the inelastic zone can be estimated by solving for $r_p$:

$$\frac{r_p}{a} = sec\left(\frac{\pi\sigma^\infty}{2\sigma_y}\right) - 1$$

In the case where $\sigma^\infty \ll \sigma_y$, and therefore $r_p \ll a$, the plastic zone size is:

$$r_p = \frac{\pi}{8}\left(\frac{K_I}{\sigma_y}\right)^2$$

which is similar to, but slightly smaller than Irwin's predicted plastic zone diameter.

==== Crack-tip opening displacement ====
The general form of the crack tip opening displacement according to the Dugdale model at the points $x = \pm a$ and $y=0$ is:

$$\delta_t = \frac{8\sigma_y a}{\pi E} \ln\left[\sec\left(\frac{\pi \sigma^{\infty}}{2\sigma_{y}}\right)\right]$$

This can be simplified for cases where $\sigma^\infty \ll \sigma_{y}$ to:

$$\delta_t = \begin{cases} \cfrac{K^2}{\sigma_y E} & \text{plane stress} \\
\cfrac{K^2}{2\sigma_y E} & \text{plane strain} \end{cases}$$

=== Barenblatt model ===
The Barenblatt model (after G.I. Barenblatt) is analogous to the Dugdale model, but is applied to brittle solids. This approach considers the interatomic stresses involved cracking, but considers a large enough area to apply to continuum fracture mechanics. Barenblatt's model assumes that "the width of the edge [cohesive] region of a crack is small compared to the size of the whole crack" in addition to the assumption for most fracture mechanics models that the stress fields of all cracks are the same for a given specimen geometry regardless of the remote applied stress. In the Barenblatt model, the traction, $\sigma_{yy}$, is equal to the theoretical bond rupture strength of a brittle solid. This allows the strain energy release rate, $G$, to be defined by the critical crack opening displacement, $\delta_c = 2v_c$ or the critical cohesive zone size, $r_{co}$, as follows:

$$G_c = 2\int^{\nu_c}_0 \sigma_{yy}d\nu = \frac{8\sigma_{th}^2 r_{co}}{\pi E} = 2\gamma_s$$

where $\gamma_s$ is the surface energy.
