= Souleo =

Peter Wright, known professionally as "Souleo" is an American curator, writer and events producer who previously produced public programs at the Newark Museum and SAGE.

Among the shows he's curated are: a 2013 show of Melvin Van Peebles' work at Strivers Gardens Gallery, a 2016 show at Rush Arts Gallery about the role of buttons, the 2020 show Styling: Black Expression, Rebellion and Joy through Fashion, a show about Dionne Warwick's tweets, and a 2021 show, Showing Out: Fashion in Harlem, about the history of the Harlem Institute of Fashion and the Black Fashion Museum.
