= Journal of Sandwich Structures and Materials =

- Discipline: Engineering
- Language: English
- Edited by: Professor Magd Abdel Wahab

Publication details
- History: 1999-present
- Publisher: SAGE Publications
- Frequency: Bi-monthly
- Impact factor: 5.015 (2018)

Standard abbreviations
- ISO 4: J. Sandw. Struct. Mater.

Indexing
- CODEN: JSSMFI
- ISSN: 1099-6362 (print); 1530-7972 (web)
- LCCN: 99110985
- OCLC no.: 311794844

Links
- Journal homepage; Online access; Online archive

Journal of Sandwich Structures and Materials is a peer-reviewed academic journal that publishes papers in the field of Materials Science. The journal's editor-in-chief is Professor Magd Abdel Wahab (Ghent University). It has been in publication since 1999 and is currently published by SAGE Publications.

== Scope ==
Journal of Sandwich Structures and Materials is an international journal which publishes developments in the science, technology and professional practices of sandwich construction. Each edition of Journal of Sandwich Structures and Materials is published bi-monthly and focuses on the current research being conducted to solve problems within the field.

== Abstracting and indexing ==
Journal of Sandwich Structures and Materials is abstracted and indexed in, among other databases: SCOPUS, and the Social Sciences Citation Index. According to the Journal Citation Reports, its 2018 impact factor is 5.015, ranking it 5 out of 129 journals in the category ‘Engineering, Mechanical’. and 1 out of 33 journals in the category ‘Materials Science Characterization & Testing’. and 5 out of 25 journals in the category ‘Materials Science, Composites ’.
