= Theoretical strength of a solid =

The theoretical strength of a solid is the maximum possible stress a perfect solid can withstand. It is often much higher than what current real materials can achieve. The lowered fracture stress is due to defects, such as interior or surface cracks. One of the goals for the study of mechanical properties of materials is to design and fabricate materials exhibiting strength close to the theoretical limit.

== Definition ==
When a solid is in tension, its atomic bonds stretch, elastically. Once a critical strain is reached, all the atomic bonds on the fracture plane rupture and the material fails mechanically. The stress at which the solid fractures is the theoretical strength, often denoted as $\sigma_{th}$. After fracture, the stretched atomic bonds return to their initial state, except that two surfaces have formed.

The theoretical strength is often approximated as:

$$\sigma_{th} \cong \frac{E}{10}$$

where

- $\sigma_{th}$ is the maximum theoretical stress the solid can withstand.
- E is the Young's Modulus of the solid.

== Derivation ==
The stress-displacement, or $\sigma$ vs x, relationship during fracture can be approximated by a sine curve, $\sigma = \sigma_{th} sin(2\pi x/\lambda)$, up to $\lambda$/4. The initial slope of the $\sigma$ vs x curve can be related to Young's modulus through the following relationship:

$$\left (\frac{d\sigma}{dx} \right )_{x=0} = \left (\frac{d\sigma}{d\epsilon} \right )_{x=0} \left (\frac{d\epsilon}{dx} \right )_{x=0} = E\left (\frac{d\epsilon}{dx} \right )_{x=0}$$

where

- $\sigma$ is the stress applied.
- E is the Young's Modulus of the solid.
- $\epsilon$ is the strain experienced by the solid.
- x is the displacement.

The strain $\epsilon$ can be related to the displacement x by $\epsilon = x/a_0$, and $a_0$ is the equilibrium inter-atomic spacing. The strain derivative is therefore given by $\left (\frac{d\epsilon}{dx} \right)_{x=0} = 1/a_0$

The relationship of initial slope of the $\sigma$ vs x curve with Young's modulus thus becomes

$$\left (\frac{d\sigma}{dx} \right )_{x=0} =  E/a_0$$

The sinusoidal relationship of stress and displacement gives a derivative:

$$\left (\frac{d\sigma}{dx} \right ) = \left (\frac{2\pi}{\lambda} \right ) \sigma_{th}  cos\left (\frac{2\pi x}{\lambda} \right ) = \left (\frac{2\pi  \sigma}{\lambda} \right )_{x\rightarrow0}$$

By setting the two $d\sigma/dx$ together, the theoretical strength becomes:

$$\sigma_{th} = \frac{\lambda E}{2\pi a_0} \cong \frac{E}{2\pi} \cong \frac{E}{10}$$

The theoretical strength can also be approximated using the fracture work per unit area, which result in slightly different numbers. However, the above derivation and final approximation is a commonly used metric for evaluating the advantages of a material's mechanical properties.

== See also ==
- Strength of materials
- Fracture mechanics
- Solid mechanics
- Stress (mechanics)
- Ultimate tensile strength
- Fracture
- Creep (deformation)
- Material Failure Theory
