= Rachelle Mozman Solano =

American artist (born 1972)

Rachelle Anayansi Mozman Solano (born 1972) is an American visual artist working in photography, moving image, and collage and a clinical psychoanalyst born in New York City. She currently works in both New York and in Panama. Mozman Solano's photographs and films simultaneously explore the importance of narrative and archetype, the way that stories shape culture and individuals, and the diad between the human condition and the soul.

== Early life and education ==
Rachelle Anayansi Mozman Solano is a first generation American and was born and grew up in New York City. She works between New York City and Panama, her maternal family's country. Her mother is of African, Indigenous, Asian and Spanish ancestry. Her father is Jewish and was born in Poland, and the family later moved to France. Her parents met at Hunter College at CUNY shortly after both immigrating to the U.S. and were committed to the Trotskyist movement for many years. Her paternal grandparents were sample maker's, and moved to New York City to work in the garment industry.

Mozman Solano graduated from Fiorello H. LaGuardia High School for Music & Art and the Performing Arts in New York City. She earned an MFA in Photography from Tyler School of Art at Temple University, where she studied with Coco Fusco, and a BFA from Purchase College at SUNY, where she studied with cinema and media studies historian Tom Gunning and artists Gregory Crewdson, Jo Ann Walters, Mary Lucier and Antonio Frasconi.

Her artworks deeply engage in clinical psychoanalysis. Mozman Solano has 14 years of psychoanalytic training from the National Psychological Association for Psychoanalysis, New York. She worked as a clinical psychoanalyst between 2010 and 2017.

She is currently teaching at School of the Museum of Fine Arts at Tufts University as a professor of the Practice in Photography since 2018.

== Art ==
Mozman Solano's artistic practice explores how mythology, history, the psyche, and economics overlap and become part of the psychological and somatic experience. Mozman Solano's work addresses trauma as a consequence of racial supremacism, diaspora and subjugation, particularly in the experience of women. Her photographs and videos address narrative, and the exploration of narrative as shaped by perception.

Her 2018 project Metamorphosis of Failure was inspired by a 2014 MoMA exhibition of the works of Paul Gauguin. Mozman Solano explored Gauguin's interest in racial purity against his biracial background, as well as the role of the museum in shaping cultural perceptions of him. This project also engages with a feminist critique by creating images of Gauguin's muses and their poses.

In 2020 Mozman Solano released her monograph Colonial Echo with Kris Graves Projects, bringing together two related bodies of work, Casa de Mujeres and La Negra. The work draws upon her family biography and interviews. In Casa de Mujeres she addresses the experience colonialism in Panama and its impact. In La Negra she explores her family's migration to the American south, and later to New York City. The name for the title La Negra, comes from the nickname given to her grandmother by her family.

Mozman Solano has held residencies at institutions including The Camera Club of New York, Light Work, LMCC workspace, and Smack Mellon, as well as a Guggenheim Fellowship and a Fulbright Fellowship. Mozman Solano's work has been reviewed in The New York Times, Artnexus, The Village Voice, The Wall Street Journal. Her work has been published in Aperture Magazine, Exit magazine, Contact Sheet: The Light Work Annual, Presumed Innocence, Vogue Italia, and numerous other publications.

== Selected exhibitions ==
=== Individual exhibitions ===
- 2021 All These Things I Carry With Me, South Bend Museum of Art, South Bend, IN
- 2019 Metamorphosis of Failure, Smack Mellon, New York, NY
- 2018 El espejo opaco de Gauguin, Arteconsult, Panamá, Panamá
- 2010 Equivalent, Arteconsult, Panama City, Panama
- 2010 Costa del Este, En Foco Traveling Exhibition program, Aguilar Library/NYPL, New York, NY
- 2009 American Exurbia/Costa del Este, Festival Biarritz, Biarritz, France
- 2009 Exurbia, Sol del Rio Arte Contemporánea, Guatemala City, Guatemala
- 2006 American Exurbia, Metaphor Contemporary Art, Brooklyn, NY
- 2003 New Photographs, PH gallery, New York, NY

=== Group exhibitions ===
- 2026 Subvert, Repair, Reclaim: Contemporary Artists Take Back the Nude, Museum of Fine Art, Boston
- 2025 You, the Performer, Casemore gallery, San Francisco, CA
- 2025 The Rose, Center for Photography at Woodstock, Kingston, NY
- 2024 One More Thing, Purchase College, SUNY, Purchase, NY
- 2024 Siete, Mateo Sariel Galeria, Panamá, Panamá
- 2024 Conversations, Silber Art Gallery, Gouecher College, Baltimore, MD
- 2023 Something Beautiful: Reframing La Colleción (Rotation 2), El Museo del Barrio, NY, NY
- 2023 The Rose, The Lumber Room, Portland, Oregon
- 2023, Entre/Between, the Momentary at Crystal Bridges Museum of American Art, Bentonville, AR
- 2023, Vaciar La Categoría, Museo de Arte Contemporáneo, Panamá, Panamá
- 2023, Light Work 50th Anniversary Exhibition, Everson Museum, Syracuse, NY
- 2022, Banana Craze, Center for Visual Art, Metropolitan State University of Denver, Denver, CO
- 2022, MOTHER, Mason Exhibitions, Fairfax, Virginia
- 2021 An Active and Urgent Telling, Schaefer Gallery, Gustavus Adolphus College, Saint Peter, MN
- 2020 Word, Image, Object, Action: Benefit Exhibition, Transmitter gallery, New York, NY
- 2020 The Right to Herself, Lincoln Center gallery, Center for Fine Art Photography, Fort Collins, CO
- 2020 Future Perfect, Studyhall gallery, Pratt MWP College of Art & Design, Utica, NY
- 2019 Hijas de La Luz y Sombra, Arteconsult, Panamá, Panamá
- 2019 How to Read a Banana: A screening with Rachelle Mozman Solano & Nicole Won Hee Maloof, (screening), SOHO20 gallery, Brooklyn, NY
- 2019 Yes: Rachelle Mozman Solano/Ezra Wube, (screening) Microscope gallery, Brooklyn, NY
- 2018 Humble Cats:Photoville Edition, Photoville, Brooklyn, NY
- 2017 Panamá Expandida, Museo de Arte Contemporáneo, Panamá, Panamá
- 2016 X Bienal Centroaméricana, Museo Arte y Diseño Contemporáneo, San Jose, Costa Rica
- 2015 Do/Tell, Institute of Contemporary Art University of Pennsylvania, Philadelphia PA
- 2014 Portraiture Now: Staging the Self, National Portrait Gallery, Smithsonian Institution, Washington, DC
- 2013 In the Zone, Station Independent Projects, New York, NY
- 2012 You Are My Mirror, Athens Photo Festival, Ariadne Photo gallery, Athens, Greece
- 2011 The (S) Files Bienal, El Museo del Barrio, New York, NY
- 2010 Parábola: Una línea imaginaría entre mujeres fotógrafas, Centro Cultural España, San Salvador, El Salvador
- 2009 Dialogues: Chapters of Latin American Art in the MOLAA Permanent Collection, MOLAA, Long Beach, CA
- 2008 Numero Cero, 2nd Trienal Poligrafica de Puerto Rico y el Caribe, San Juan, Puerto Rico
- 2007 Sutil Violencia, Instituto Cultural Itaõ, São Paulo, Brazil
- 2006 IV Bienal Centroaméricana, San Salvador, El Salvador
- 2005 Séptima Bienal de Arte Panamá, Museo de Arte Contemporáneo, Panamá, Panamá

== Awards ==
- 2024 Guggenheim Fellowship
- 2019 NYSCA/NYFA Artist Fellowship
- 2018 Neubauer Faculty Fellow
- 2017 Latin American Roaming Art
- 2016 NYC Film and Media Grant, Jerome Foundation
- 2013 The Puffin Foundation
- 2012 Critical Mass Photolucida, Top 50
- 2012 Finalist, 86th International Competition in Photography, The Print Center, Philadelphia, PA
- 2011 Lens Culture, 2nd Prize Winner
