= Ball-on-ring test =

Biaxial strength testing method

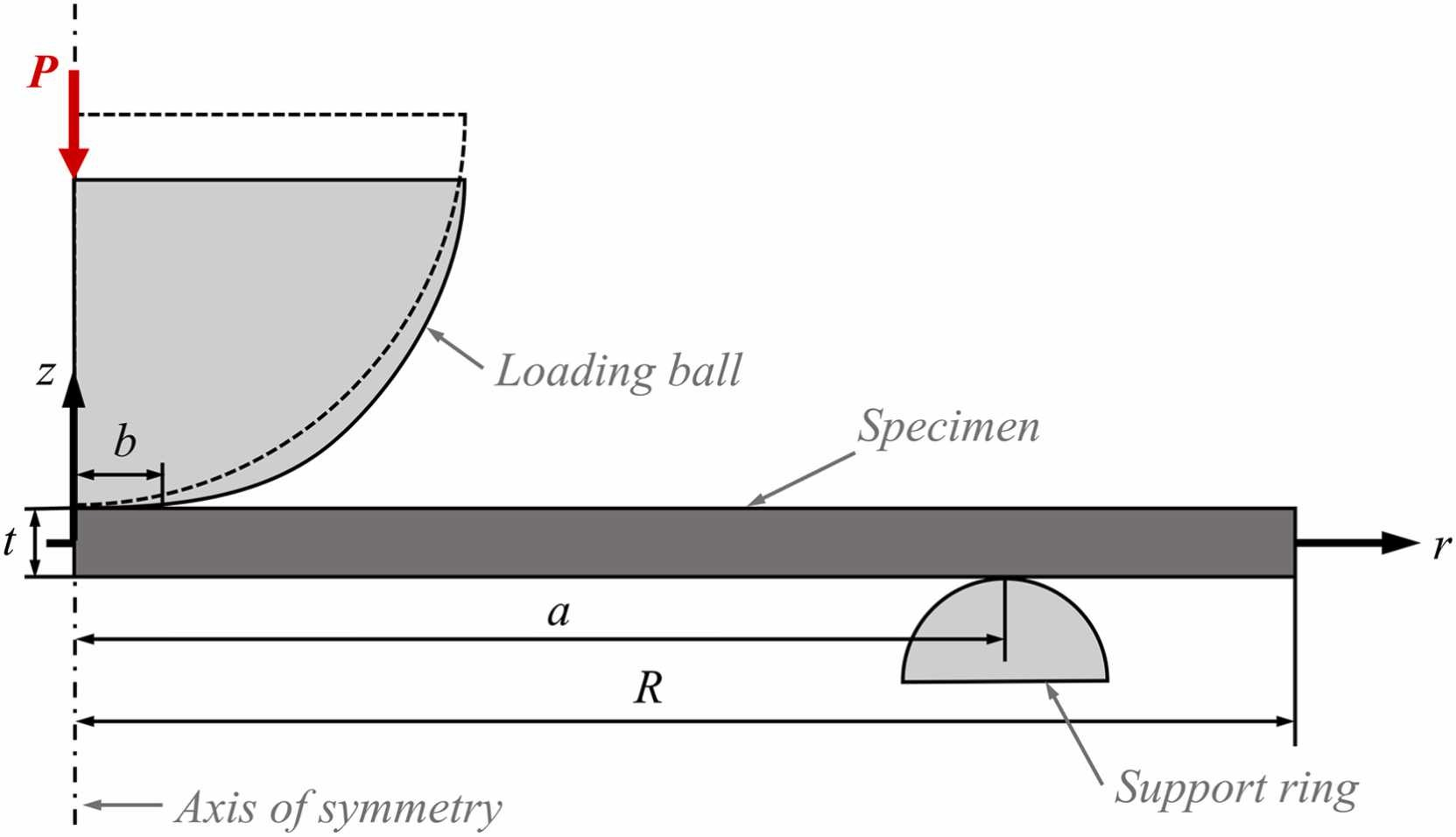
Cross-sectional sketch of the ball-on-ring test set-up. $R$ represents the specimen radius, $t$ its thickness, $a$ the radius of the support ring, $b$ the loading or contact radius, and $P$ the total applied load.

The ball-on-ring test (BoR test) is a mechanical testing method for determining the biaxial strength of brittle materials, particularly in thin disc-shaped specimens. Its use has been standardized in procedures such as ASTM F394-78, and it has become widely adopted in industrial and academic settings due to its reliability in measuring surface flaw sensitivity, particularly after processes like wafer backgrinding. Unlike uniaxial tests, the BoR test directs the highest tensile stresses to the center of the specimen, away from potentially flawed edges, improving reproducibility and relevance for real-world applications.

== History ==
The foundational stress models for the ball-on-ring (BoR) test were rooted in classical plate theory. Early work by A. F. Kirstein and R. M. Woolley (1967) addressed symmetrical bending of thin elastic plates supported at discrete points, showing that the maximum bending stress at the disk center is independent of the number of supports. D. K. Shetty later adapted their equations specifically to the BoR geometry. Parallel research by Vitman and Pukh (1963) focused on strength estimation of sheet glass using central loading over a ring, establishing similar theoretical groundwork.

A major challenge in early models was the assumption of a uniform pressure distribution under the loading ball. This simplification, while necessary for analytical solutions, introduced a paradox: true point loading produces a mathematical singularity in stress, which is not observed in practice due to finite contact areas from elastic deformation. To address this, the Hertz elastic contact theory was applied to estimate the actual contact radius ($z$) between the ball and the specimen. This led to further refinement by incorporating Westergaard's (1926) equivalent radius ($beq$), which approximates the zone over which the load can be considered uniform.

== Test method ==
The ball-on-ring (BoR) test is a biaxial flexural strength testing method developed for brittle materials, such as ceramics, glass, and semiconductor wafers. It involves placing a thin, disc-shaped specimen on a circular support ring and applying a central load through a spherical indenter or ball. The loading ball is typically aligned with the center of the support ring using a centering device to ensure uniform stress distribution. Key geometric parameters include the loading ball radius, support ring radius, specimen thickness and radius, and the contact radius between the ball and specimen.

== Stress analysis ==
Radial and tangential stresses can be approximated analytically, as in the Kirstein and Woolley solution, though the accuracy depends on defining the effective contact radius. The Hertz contact theory is used to estimate the contact radius, and the Westergaard approximation relates this contact area to the equivalent radius of uniform loading. Finite element method (FEM) is widely used to validate these models and account for geometric nonlinearity, contact mechanics, and anisotropy.

For thin specimens, large deflections can lead to overestimated stresses in linear models. Correction factors derived from nonlinear FEM have been proposed to improve accuracy, depending primarily on specimen geometry rather than material properties. Material anisotropy, such as in monocrystalline silicon, also influences stress distribution and is often included in numerical simulations.
