= Jaret Vadera =

Canadian artist (born 1976)

- Born: 1976 (age 48–49); Toronto, Ontario, Canada
- Education: Ontario College of Art and Design; Cooper Union; Yale School of Art
- Website: http://jaretvadera.com

Jaret Vadera (born 1976) is a Canadian artist working between New York, Toronto, and India. Vadera works across media, primarily in the spaces where painting, photography, video installation, and new media intersect.

== Early life and education ==
Vadera was born in Toronto in 1976. His mother and father both immigrated to Canada in the 1960s and 1970s as part of a large wave of immigration. Vadera's father was born in India and his mother in the Philippines. Vadera is of Indian, Filipino and Spanish descent. His parents were working-class immigrants who practiced different religions, and spoke different languages. Vadera describes how growing up in his family, in Toronto, at that particular time, "set the stage for his ongoing explorations into the ways that beliefs, codes, and processes of translation shape and control how we see."

In 1999, Vadera graduated from the Ontario College of Art and Design, and participated in the Mobility Program in Fine Arts at the Cooper Union School of Art (New York, NY) the same year. He received his Master in Fine Arts in Painting and Printmaking from the Yale School of Art (New Haven, CT) in 2009.

== Career ==
Vadera works across media, primarily in the spaces where painting, photography, video installation, and new media intersect. Through his work, Vadera explores how different social, technological, biological, and cognitive processes shape and control the ways that we see the world around and within us. He often takes "things" apart, and puts them back together in new ways. Rorschach tests, algorithms, maps, infographics, and logic paradoxes are often redeployed to locate ambivalent in-between spaces, to reveal malignant meanings, and to explore the poetics of representation. Mixing metaphors, shifting historical and cultural references, and code switching are some of his key strategies.

In parallel to his career as an exhibiting artist, Vadera has also been active as an organizer, programmer, curator, researcher, writer, editor, educator, and designer on projects that focus on using art as a catalyst for social change / justice.

== Selected exhibitions ==
Vaderas paintings, prints, photographs, videos, and installations have been exhibited and screened internationally at:

- Maraya Art Centre, Sharjah, UAE (2015)
- Bhau Daji Lad Museum, Mumbai, IN (2014)
- William Paterson University Gallery, Paterson, NJ, US (2014)
- Bronx River Art Center, Bronx, US (2014)
- Films Division of India, Mumbai, IN (2013)
- Bose Pacia Gallery, New York, US (2012)
- EFA - Project Space, New York, US (2011)
- Project 88, Mumbai, IN (2010)
- Tilton Gallery, New York, US (2010)
- Religare Arts, New Delhi, IN (2010)
- Thomas Erben Gallery, New York, US (2009)
- Triple Candie, New York, US (2009)
- PPOW Gallery, New York, US (2009)
- Art and Culture Center of Hollywood, Hollywood, US (2008)
- Aljira, a Center for Contemporary Art, Newark, US (2007)
- New York Arab and South Asian Film Festival, New York, US (2007)
- Queens Museum, Queens, US (2006)(2005)
- White Box, New York, US (2005)
- Department of Canadian Heritage, Toronto, CA (2005)
- Paved Art + New Media, Saskatoon, CA (2005)
- South Asian Visual Arts Centre, Toronto, CA (2004)
- PH Gallery, New York, US (2004)
- A.W.O.L. Gallery, Toronto, CA (2001) (2003)
- SOF Art House, Toronto, CA (2002)
