= Michael Paul Britto =

American visual artist

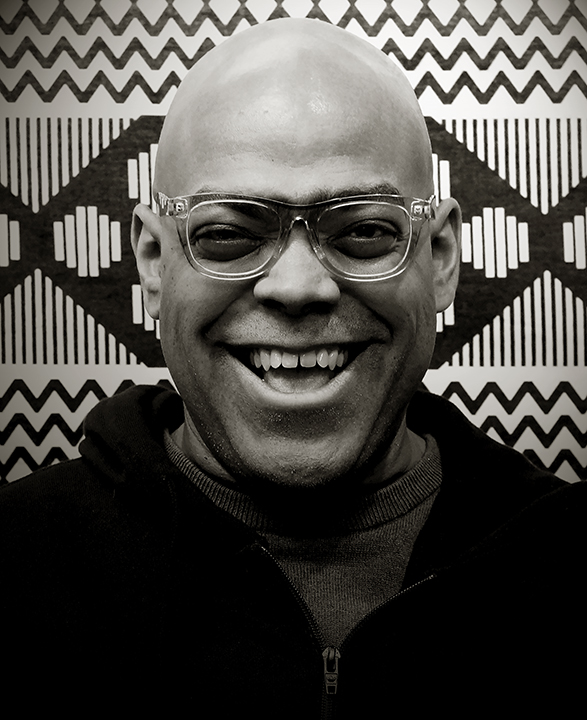
- Born: 1968 (age 57–58); Brooklyn, New York U.S.

Michael Paul Britto (born 1968) is a New York contemporary artist who explores the consequences of racial inequality through photography, video, collage, sculpture and performance. Britto shines a light on important racial issues using contemporary art. His work has been exhibited predominantly in New York, but also internationally, with exhibitions in Spain, Poland, and England. In 2004, he won the Individual Artist grant from New York State Council of The Arts, and in 2005, he was awarded the Media Arts Fellowship Grant from the Rockefeller Foundation.

== Early life and education ==
Britto was born in Brooklyn and has remained in New York throughout his life. His work is influenced by his experiences growing up and his experiences living as person of color in New York City. In 1999, Britto graduated with a Bachelor of the Arts degree in Media and Communication Arts, Cum Laude from The City College of New York. He also received AICP Commercial Production Training Certification in New York, NY in 2000. Prior to beginning his career as an artist and teacher, Britto worked in advertising and television which "may have influenced" his use of pop culture in his work.

== Career ==
Britto strives to create art that is both politically and culturally aware in order to make statements and spark conversations. "Much of my work is about being a person of color in America, and the misconceptions and assumptions that go along with that. My art allows me to make people more politically and culturally aware, by using the customary as metaphor." His art is always made with purpose, “Why make art if you’re not going to make a statement?” says Britto. Furthermore, he uses multiple mediums including photography, video, collage, sculpture, and performance to create art that activates change. His work looks to make viewers uncomfortable, because it forces them to confront racial injustice. His goals are to break stereotypes, to force people to stop ignoring the presence of racism, to give a voice to alienated communities, and to help the mainstream community gain a better understanding of these issues.

Britto's work is based on what he observes on the street every day. After being stopped and frisked in Chelsea, New York, while viewing art in a gallery, Britto created a performance piece called The Suspect Wore, 2012. He created a runway of people in front of a high end clothing store in the meatpacking district wearing the clothes that they had on when they had been stopped and frisked. Britto created another art piece about stop and frisk called The Brown Man Experience: In Our Own Words, 2014, where he photographed men who had been stopped and frisked and had them write something about themselves on a dry erase board. Michael Britto's work has been featured in multiple exhibitions, both nationally and internationally, and selected works can be seen in permanent collections at The Studio Museum, Rush Arts Collection, and Taller Boricua in New York.

=== Teaching ===
A large part of Britto's work is his work as an educator. He has taught various age groups at multiple spaces around New York, where his classes often focus on video production and issues related to race. Britto spent five years teaching at Smack Mellon’s Art Ready and Summer Arts Intensive programs, and also taught children as a media coordinator at the Boys Club of New York. He has taught basic video production at the Children's Arts Carnival in Harlem, as well as the "Visual Knowledge Program" while at The New Museum of Contemporary Art. He currently teaches at an alternative high school for young adults, who are under-credited on the Lower East Side of Manhattan, and as well teaches as a media teacher at the Downtown Community Television Center’s Pro-TV youth program.

=== Video ===
Britto's video work is often humorous while also addressing serious issues in African American history. In 2005, The Contemporary Art Museum in St. Louis, Missouri displayed two of Britto's video pieces that explore black history in pop culture. The first piece is titled Dirrrty Harriet Tubman, 2005, which creates an action-hero movie trailer that imagines Harriet Tubman as a young, strong woman rather than a maternal figure as she is often portrayed. The second piece called I'm A Slave 4 U, 2005 is a parody of the Britney Spears' song of the same title. Britto's music video casts all black actors in slave costumes with choreography that is inspired by "common slave practices."

=== Collage ===
Britto's collages have also gained interest because of his ability to combine very familiar and "haunting images" to create "jarring formations." In his Something in the Way of Things, 2015 exhibition, Britto explores the promise of the American dream. He collages glamorous, fashionable advertisements with images of guns, violence, and the Ku Klux Klan. The name of the exhibit, Something in the Way of Things, is based on the poem of the same name by Amiri Baraka. Britto chose this reference because his work brings attention to issues like alcoholism, police brutality, depression, and hopelessness. This show ran from September 24 through December 19 at Alijra, a Center for Contemporary Art, Newark, New Jersey in 2015.

== Awards and artist residencies ==
Britto has participated in many artist residencies such as the Workspace Residency at the Lower Manhattan Cultural Council, the Artist Residency Program at Smack Mellon in 2007–2008, Artist in the Marketplace at the Bronx Museum in 2006, an Artist Mentor Program with Thomas Allen Harris in 2002, and the Visual Knowledge Program at New Museum of Contemporary Art from 2001 to 2002. Britto also received the Individual Artist grant from the New York State Council of The Arts and the Media Arts Fellowship Grant from the Rockefeller Foundation.

== Selected exhibitions ==
- "Say It Loud" The ARC building, curated by Tumelo Mosaka, Miami, FL 2016
- “Rush20: 1995-2015” Rush Philanthropic Arts Foundation, Brooklyn, New York November 15- December 20, 2015
- “Something in the Way of Things” Alijra, a Center for Contemporary Art, Newark, New Jersey, September 24 - December 19, 2015
- “Cut N Mix: Contemporary Collage” El Museo Del Barrio, New York, New York July 22 - December 12, 2015
- Uncomfortable Truths – The Shadow Of Slave Trading On Contemporary Art & Design, Victoria and Albert Museum, South Kensington, London 2007
- Black Alphabet – Contexts of Contemporary African American Art, Zacheta National Gallery of Art, Warsaw, Poland 2006
- The Art Palace Madrid, Madrid, Spain 2004
