= Toughness =

Material ability to absorb energy and plastically deform without fracturing

Toughness as defined by the area under the stress–strain curve for one unit volume of the material.

In materials science and metallurgy, toughness is the ability of a material to absorb energy and plastically deform without fracturing. Toughness is the strength with which the material opposes rupture. One definition of material toughness is the amount of energy per unit volume that a material can absorb before rupturing. This measure of toughness is different from that used for fracture toughness, which describes the capacity of materials to resist fracture. Toughness requires a balance of strength and ductility.

== Toughness and strength ==
Toughness is related to the area under the stress–strain curve. In order to be tough, a material must be both strong and ductile. For example, brittle materials (like ceramics) that are strong but with limited ductility are not tough; conversely, very ductile materials with low strengths are also not tough. To be tough, a material should withstand both high stresses and high strains. Generally speaking, strength indicates how much force the material can support, while toughness indicates how much energy a material can absorb before rupturing.

== Mathematical definition ==
Toughness can be determined by integrating the stress-strain curve. It is the energy absorbed during plastic deformation per unit volume prior to fracture. The explicit mathematical description is:

$$\tfrac{\mbox{energy}}{\mbox{volume}} = \int_{0}^{\varepsilon_f} \sigma\, d\varepsilon$$

where

- $\varepsilon$ is strain
- $\varepsilon_f$ is the strain upon failure
- $\sigma$ is stress

If the upper limit of integration up to the yield point is restricted, the energy absorbed per unit volume is known as the modulus of resilience. Mathematically, the modulus of resilience can be expressed by the product of the square of the yield stress divided by two times the Young's modulus of elasticity. That is,

Modulus of resilience = (Yield stress^{2})/(2 (Young's modulus))

== Toughness tests ==
The toughness of a material can be measured using a small specimen of that material. A typical testing machine uses a pendulum to deform a notched specimen of defined cross-section. The height from which the pendulum fell, minus the height to which it rose after deforming the specimen, multiplied by the weight of the pendulum, is a measure of the energy absorbed by the specimen as it was deformed during the impact with the pendulum. The Charpy and Izod notched impact strength tests are typical ASTM tests used to determine toughness.

== Unit of toughness ==
Tensile toughness (or deformation energy, U_{T}) is measured in units of joule per cubic metre (J·m^{−3}), or equivalently newton-metre per cubic metre (N·m·m^{−3}), in the SI system and inch-pound-force per cubic inch (in·lbf·in^{−3}) in US customary units:

- 1.00 N·m·m^{−3} ≃ 0.000145 in·lbf·in^{−3}
- 1.00 in·lbf·in^{−3} ≃ 6.89 kN·m·m^{−3}.

In the SI system, the unit of tensile toughness can be easily calculated by using area underneath the stress–strain (σ–ε) curve, which gives tensile toughness value, as given below:

- U_{T} = Area underneath the stress–strain (σ–ε) curve = σ × ε
- U_{T} [=] F/A × ΔL/L = (N·m^{−2})·(unitless)
- U_{T} [=] N·m·m^{−3}
- U_{T} [=] J·m^{−3}

== Toughest material ==
An alloy made of almost equal amounts of chromium, cobalt, and nickel (CrCoNi) is the toughest material discovered thus far. It resists fracturing even at incredibly cold temperatures close to absolute zero. It is being considered as a material to be used in building spacecraft.

== See also ==
- Hardness
- Rubber toughening
- Shock (mechanics)
- Tablet hardness testing
