= Charpy =

Charpy is a surname. Notable people with the surname include:

- Georges Charpy (1865–1945), French scientist
  - Charpy impact test, a standard test to determine the amount of energy a material absorbs during fracture
- Lorette Charpy (born 2001), French artistic gymnast
