= Jochspitze =

Mountain in the Allgäu Alps

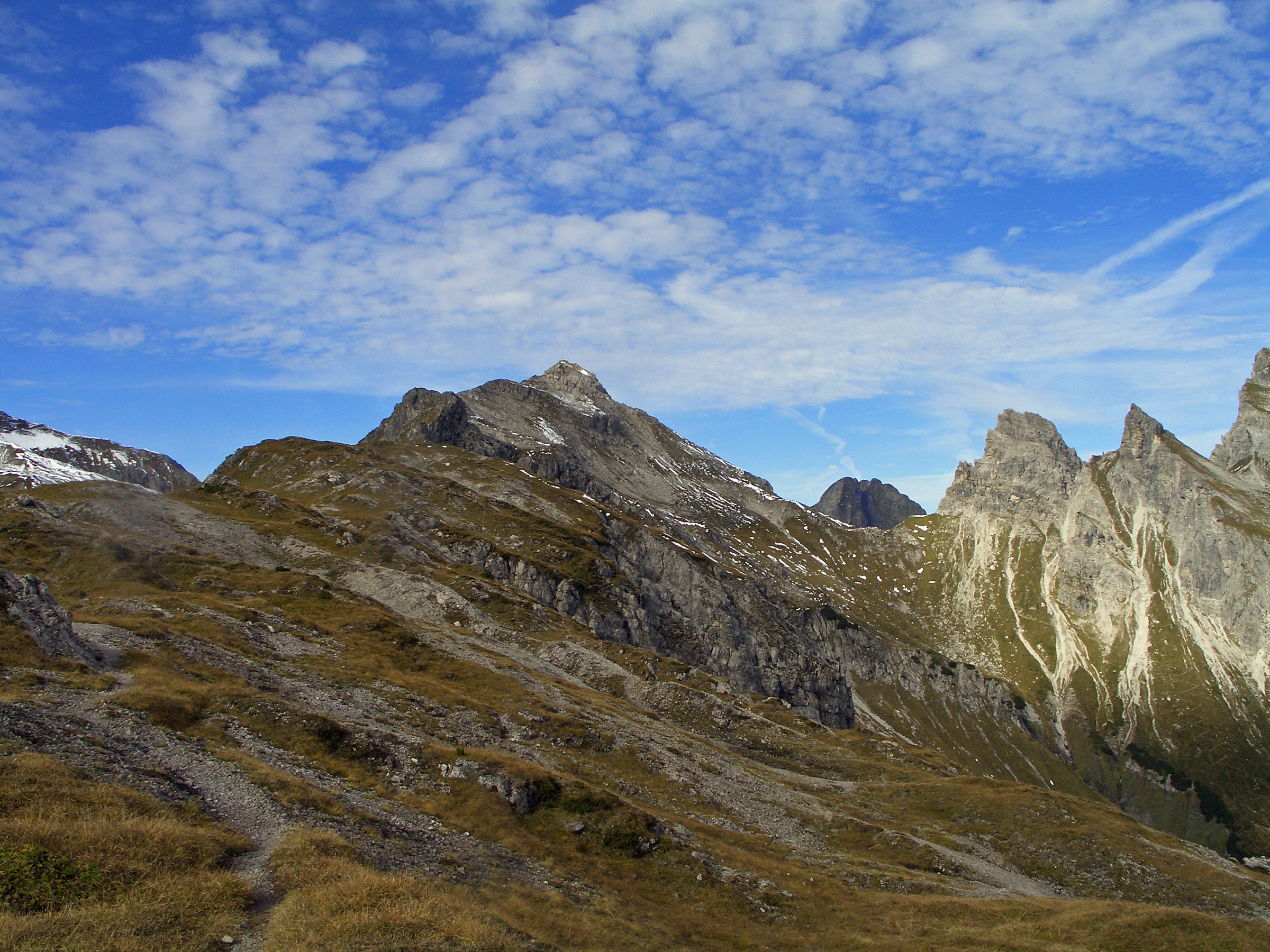
- Jochspitze from the Kanzberg; on the right summits of Höfats and Northern and Southern Höllhorn

Highest point
- Elevation: 2,232 m (7,323 ft)
- Coordinates: 47°21′15″N 10°23′0″E

Geography
- Location: Border of Bavaria, Germany and Tyrol, Austria

The Jochspitze is a 2,232 metres (7,323 ft) high peak in the Allgäu Alps, located on the border of Bavaria, Germany and Tyrol, Austria.
