= Mechanical testing =

Application of forces to an item to determine its properties

Mechanical testing covers a wide range of tests, which can be divided broadly into two types:

1. those that aim to determine a material's mechanical properties, independent of geometry.
2. those that determine the response of a structure to a given action, e.g. testing of composite beams, aircraft structures to destruction, etc.

== Mechanical testing of materials ==
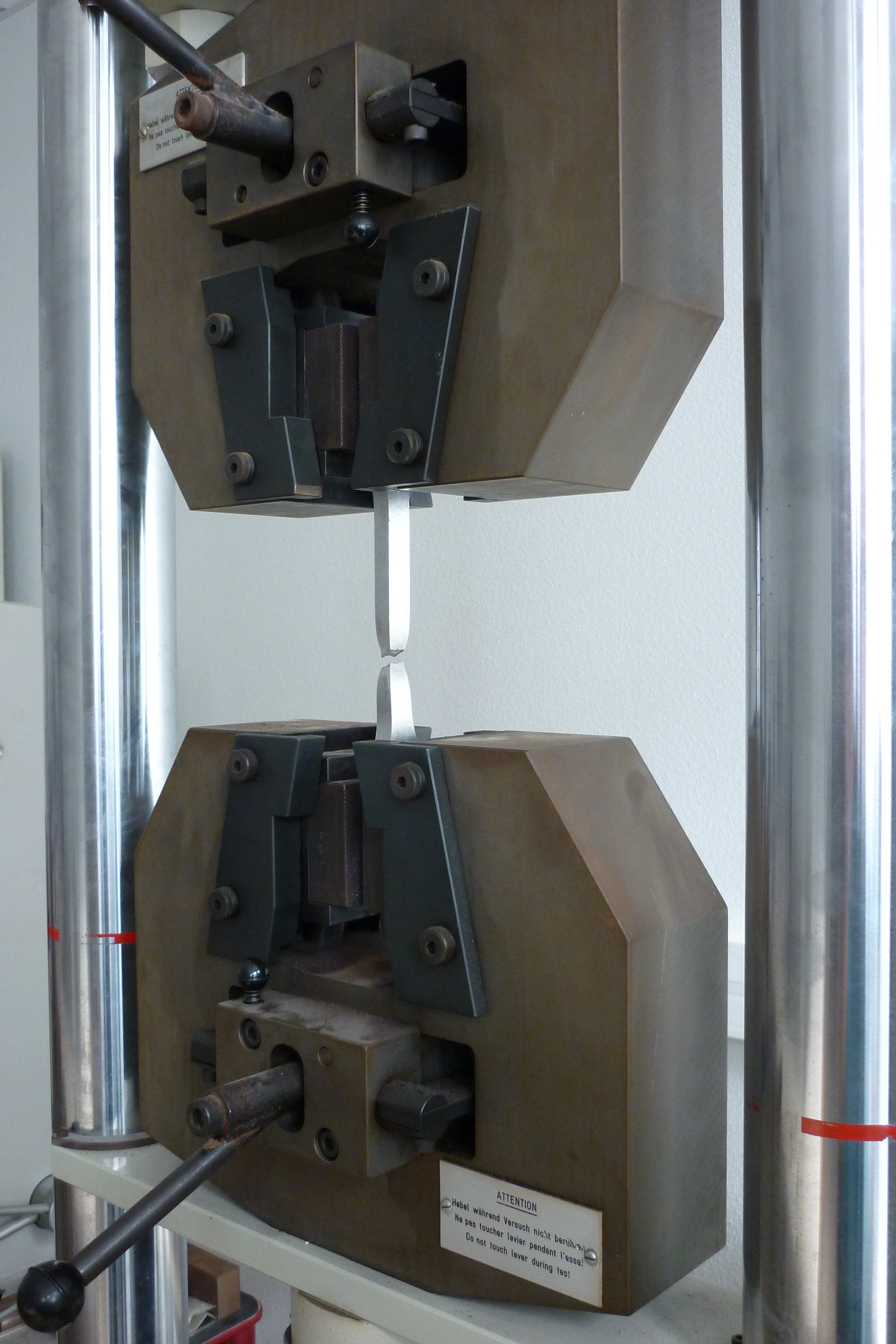
Tensile test. A standard specimen is subjected to a gradually increasing load (force) until failure occurs. The resultant load-displacement behaviour is used to determine a stress–strain curve, from which a number of mechanical properties can be measured.

There exists a large number of tests, many of which are standardized, to determine the various mechanical properties of materials. In general, such tests set out to obtain geometry-independent properties; i.e. those intrinsic to the bulk material. In practice this is not always feasible, since even in tensile tests, certain properties can be influenced by specimen size and/or geometry. Here is a listing of some of the most common tests:

- Hardness Testing
  - Vickers hardness test (HV), which has one of the widest scales
  - Brinell hardness test (HB)
  - Knoop hardness test (HK), for measurement over small areas
  - Janka hardness test, for wood
  - Meyer hardness test
  - Rockwell hardness test (HR), principally used in the USA
  - Shore durometer hardness, used for polymers
  - Barcol hardness test, for composite materials
- Tensile testing, used to obtain the stress-strain curve for a material, and from there, properties such as Young modulus, yield (or proof) stress, tensile stress and % elongation to failure.
- Impact testing
  - Izod test
  - Charpy test
- Fracture toughness testing
  - Linear-elastic (K_{Ic})
  - K–R curve
  - Elastic plastic (J_{Ic}, CTOD)
- Creep Testing, for the mechanical behaviour of materials at high temperatures (relative to their melting point)
- Fatigue Testing, for the behaviour of materials under cyclic loading
  - Load-controlled smooth specimen tests
  - Strain-controlled smooth specimen tests
  - Fatigue crack growth testing
- Non-Destructive Testing

== General references ==
- Foster, P. Field (2007), The Mechanical Testing of Metals and Alloys, Read Books, ISBN 978-1406734799.
- American Society for Metals (2000), ASM Handbook Volume 8: Mechanical Testing and Evaluation, American Society for Metals, ISBN 978-0871703897.
- Fenner, Arthur J. (1965), Mechanical Testing of Materials (International monographs on materials science and technology), Newnes, ASIN B0000CMMOM.
- Foster, P. Field (2007), The Mechanical Testing of Metals and Alloys, Read Books, ISBN 978-1406734799.
