= Hardness scales =

Hardness scales may refer to:

== Methods of measuring mineral hardness ==
- Scratch hardness
  - The Mohs scale of mineral hardness
- The Vickers hardness test
- The Brinell scale
- The Janka hardness test
- The Rockwell scale
- The Durometer scale
- The Barcol scale
- The Leeb rebound hardness scale
- The Rosiwal scale
- The Meyer hardness test
- The Knoop hardness test

== Other hardness scales ==
Hardness scales may also refer to:

- Methods of measuring the deposit formation by hard water.
- The scale of Pencil hardness
