= Stereotyped Nature-Inspired Aerial Grasper =

Drone mimicking landing behavior of birds

Stereotyped Nature-Inspired Aerial Graspers, or SNAG, is a type of drone built by Stanford researcher, W. R. T. Roderick, at Lentink lab in 2021 which mimics the landing behavior of birds. The focus of the drone is on its legs, and their ability to land on surfaces, such as branches, in a way that many other drones cannot. Legs of SNAG can contract and latch onto surfaces and unusually shaped targets, adjust for impact force when landing, and balance when perched (standing still or sitting on a branch). Innovations in SNAG technology can allow for expansion in drone technology in areas such as consuming batteries due to its ability to land instead of hover, and versatility when interacting with unfamiliar or changing environments.

== Inspiration ==
Inspiration for SNAG comes from the ability of birds to land on a wide variety of perches despite any variability in perch attributes. SNAG is specifically inspired by the landing of peregrine falcons and parrotlets and their ability to land on these obscure surfaces and solve this problem. Both were chosen due to their different types of foot structure, peregrine falcons have anisodactyl talons (three toes in the front and one in the back) while parrotlets have zygodactyl feet (two toes in the front and two toes in the back). Despite their different structures, testing done by launching the drone on a rail at different types of perches found very similar results in both perching capability and the ability to catch objects in the air. The anisodactyl structure was chosen due to the peregrine falcon's ability to catch and lift objects or prey into the air.

== Design ==
SNAG legs are focused on three primary parts of the leg; the 3D printed plastic bones, motor powered muscles, and string joints. These motors and strings are used extensively in the legs to perform tasks necessary to extend and contract both the legs and talons, giving SNAG the ability to perch.

=== Leg Design ===
The plastics, motors, and wires of SNAG are modeled to reflect the bones, muscles, and joints of a bird. The bones are completely 3D printed with plastic such that the weights of the legs are proportional to the weight ratio of a bird's body to its leg. The total weight of SNAG is 250g, with each leg weighing 50g. The muscles are represented by spring-powered motors that can stretch, contract, and lock the legs during the perching process. These springs are connected to wires that run along the leg in order to move each joint in its desired direction. On the toes, there are also small rubber pads that help absorb energy from the friction of the perch.

=== Landing mechanisms ===
The legs contain a digital flexor mechanism (DFM), which stretches open the talons and moves the ankle to adjust for the impact angle. Flexibility in the feet is useful in case the drone must approach a perch from an abnormal angle, or allow for a reaction to perches of different sizes. The legs work in tandem with a tendon locking mechanism (TLM), which prevents movement of the legs and talons once they are in a desired position, or locks them in place. This is similar to how one lands from a jump, when one's feet hit the ground they will start to straighten and then bend to absorb the impact of the land. When the DFM and TLM work together, the legs can adjust for energy absorption during contact in a similar way. By stretching just before impact, and then retracting after impact to slow down the impact force, lessening impact energy can lead to less damage to the drone.

== Landing Process ==
Built into the feet are accelerometers which signal to the leg that a perch has been contacted. The drone must then discern the angle of approach, impact velocity, and location of contact on the foot, all within approximately 50 milliseconds, to properly grip the surface with its talons. The equation used for landing is represented shown to be:

H_{Lx} = -v(M_{leg}(l_{leg,com}*sin(θ_{leg}-θ_{v}) + sin(θ_{v})*((-d/2)cos(θ_{leg})) + cos(θ_{v})*((d/2)sin(θ_{leg}))) - M_{body}(l_{body}*sin(θ_{leg}-θ_{v}-θ_{bal})-l_{leg,eq}*sin(θ_{leg}-θ_{v}) - sin(θ_{v})*((-d/2)cos(θ_{leg})) + cos(θ_{v})*((d/2)sin(θ_{leg}))))

Where the variable H_{Lx}= angular momentum v= speed, M_{body}= body mass, M_{leg}= leg mass, θ_{leg}= angle of the leg, θ_{v}= angle of the velocity, d= perch diameter, l_{body}= body length, θ_{bal}= balance angle, l_{leg}, _{eq}= extended leg length, and l_{leg}, com= projected location of the center of mass

What this equation represents is the legs making contact with the perch, calculating the angle it is approaching and where the contact point on the leg is, communicating to the legs and talons how much force to absorb such that the drone will not slip on the surface but also not damage its physical structure, and find the center of gravity for the drone so that it can balance itself on the perch when it lands.

To take off from the perch, the legs run the landing process backward. Transitioning from locked legs and extending by stretching them to jump off of the perch.

== Applications ==
W. R. T. Roderick originally made this device with the purpose of its ability to effectively measure biodiversity, but it innovates in reducing battery usage as well.

=== Measuring Biodiversity ===
SNAG can use its ability to land to go into forests and fly from branch to branch. Movement within environments such as forests is a struggle for normal drones as the environments vary so greatly in the types of terrain they have to be able to land on. Landing on branches and being able to move is more effective than current measures of manually setting up stationary cameras.

=== Reducing Battery Usage ===
Drones are limited by their battery life because to stay still while maintaining a viable viewpoint they have to stay hovering. This inability to land gives many traditional drones a battery life of about half an hour before needing to return from a mission. SNAG's ability to land saves battery in the propellers of the drone, allowing for extended missions.
