= Impact (mechanics) =

Great force or shock applied over a short time period during a high-speed collision

Metal spheres impacting in a Newton's cradle

In mechanics, an impact is when two bodies collide. During this collision, both bodies decelerate. The deceleration causes a high force or shock, applied over a short time period. A high force, over a short duration, usually causes more damage to both bodies than a lower force applied over a proportionally longer duration.

At normal speeds, during a perfectly inelastic collision, an object struck by a projectile will deform, and this deformation will absorb most or all of the force of the collision. Viewed from a conservation of energy perspective, the kinetic energy of the projectile is changed into heat and sound energy, as a result of the deformations and vibrations induced in the struck object. However, these deformations and vibrations cannot occur instantaneously. A high-velocity collision (an impact) does not provide sufficient time for these deformations and vibrations to occur. Thus, the struck material behaves as if it were more brittle than it would otherwise be, and the majority of the applied force goes into fracturing the material. Or, another way to look at it is that materials actually are more brittle on short time scales than on long time scales: this is related to time-temperature superposition. Impact resistance decreases with an increase in the modulus of elasticity, which means that stiffer materials will have less impact resistance. Resilient materials will have better impact resistance.

Different materials can behave in quite different ways in impact when compared with static loading conditions. Ductile materials like steel tend to become more brittle at high loading rates, and spalling may occur on the reverse side to the impact if penetration doesn't occur. The way in which the kinetic energy is distributed through the section is also important in determining its response. Projectiles apply a Hertzian contact stress at the point of impact to a solid body, with compression stresses under the point, but with bending loads a short distance away. Since most materials are weaker in tension than compression, this is the zone where cracks tend to form and grow.

== Applications ==
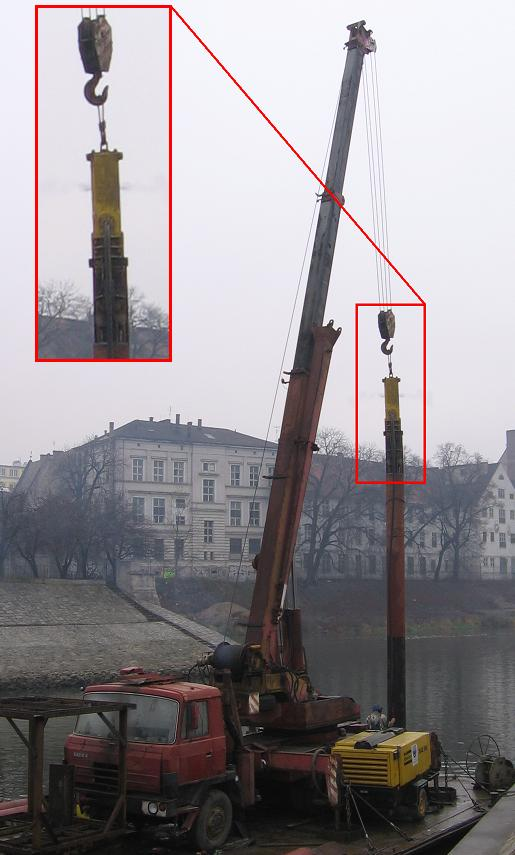
Crane with a pile driver

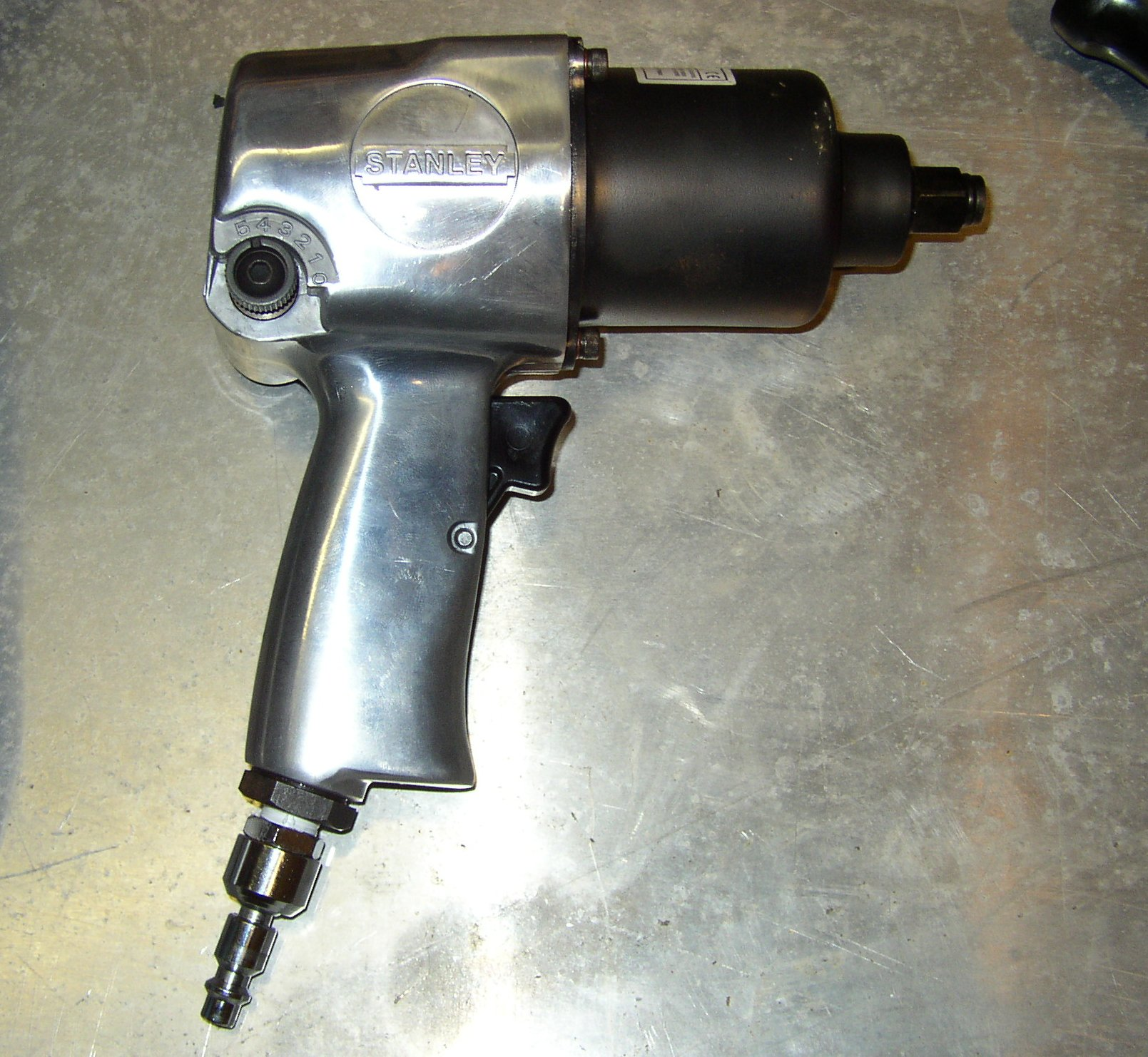
1/2 in (12.7 mm) drive pistol-grip air impact wrench

A nail is pounded with a series of impacts, each by a single hammer blow. These high velocity impacts overcome the static friction between the nail and the substrate. A pile driver achieves the same end, although on a much larger scale, the method being commonly used during civil construction projects to make building and bridge foundations. An impact wrench is a device designed to impart torque impacts to bolts to tighten or loosen them. At normal speeds, the forces applied to the bolt would be dispersed, via friction, to the mating threads. However, at impact speeds, the forces act on the bolt to move it before they can be dispersed. In ballistics, bullets utilize impact forces to puncture surfaces that could otherwise resist substantial forces. A rubber sheet, for example, behaves more like glass at typical bullet speeds. That is, it fractures, and does not stretch or vibrate.

The field of applications of impact theory ranges from the optimization of material processing, impact testing, dynamics of granular media to medical applications related to the biomechanics of the human body, especially the hip- and knee-joints. Also, it has vast applications in the automotive and military industries.

== Impacts causing damage ==
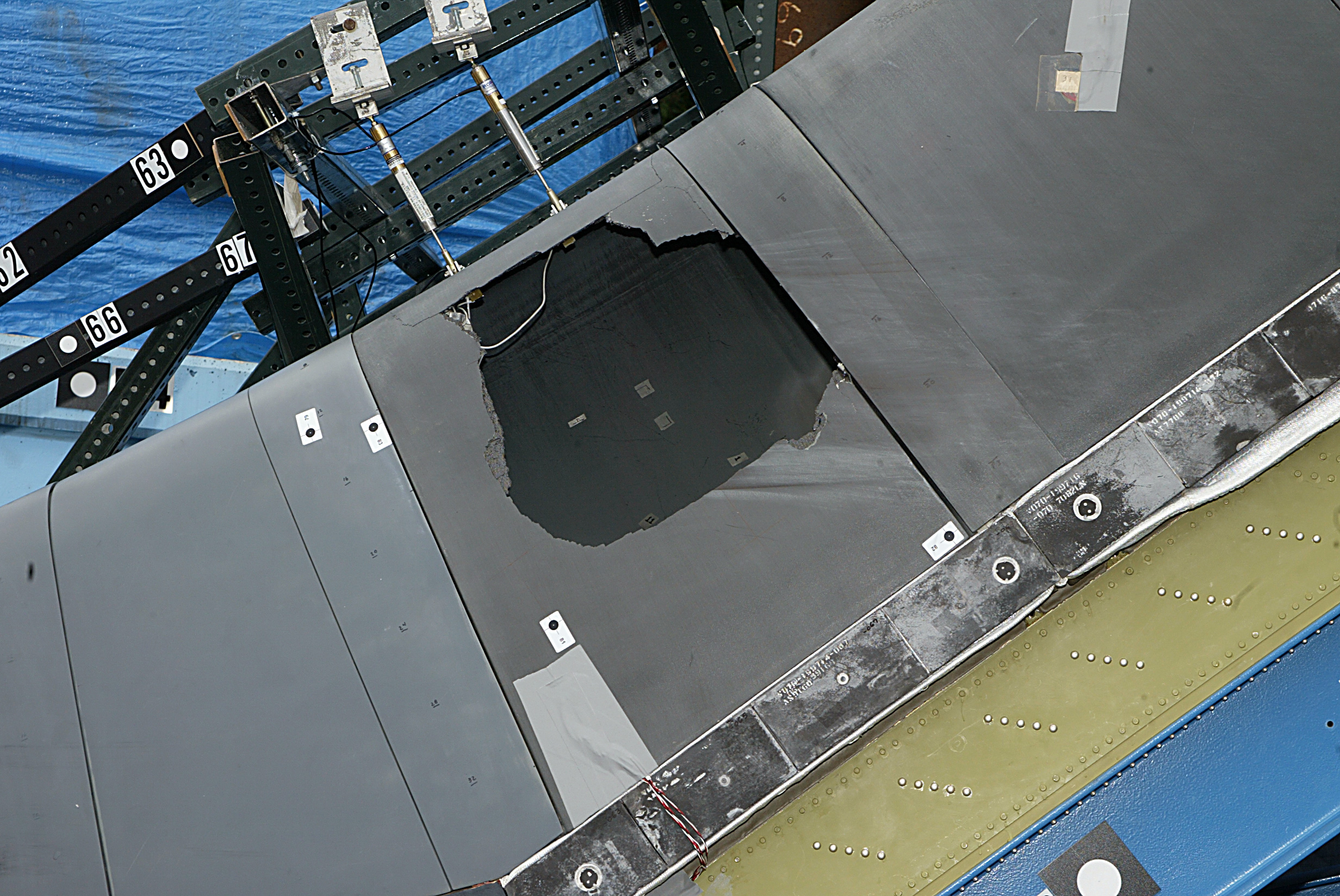
Mock-up of a Space Shuttle leading edge made with an RCC-panel taken from Atlantis showing impact damage during a test

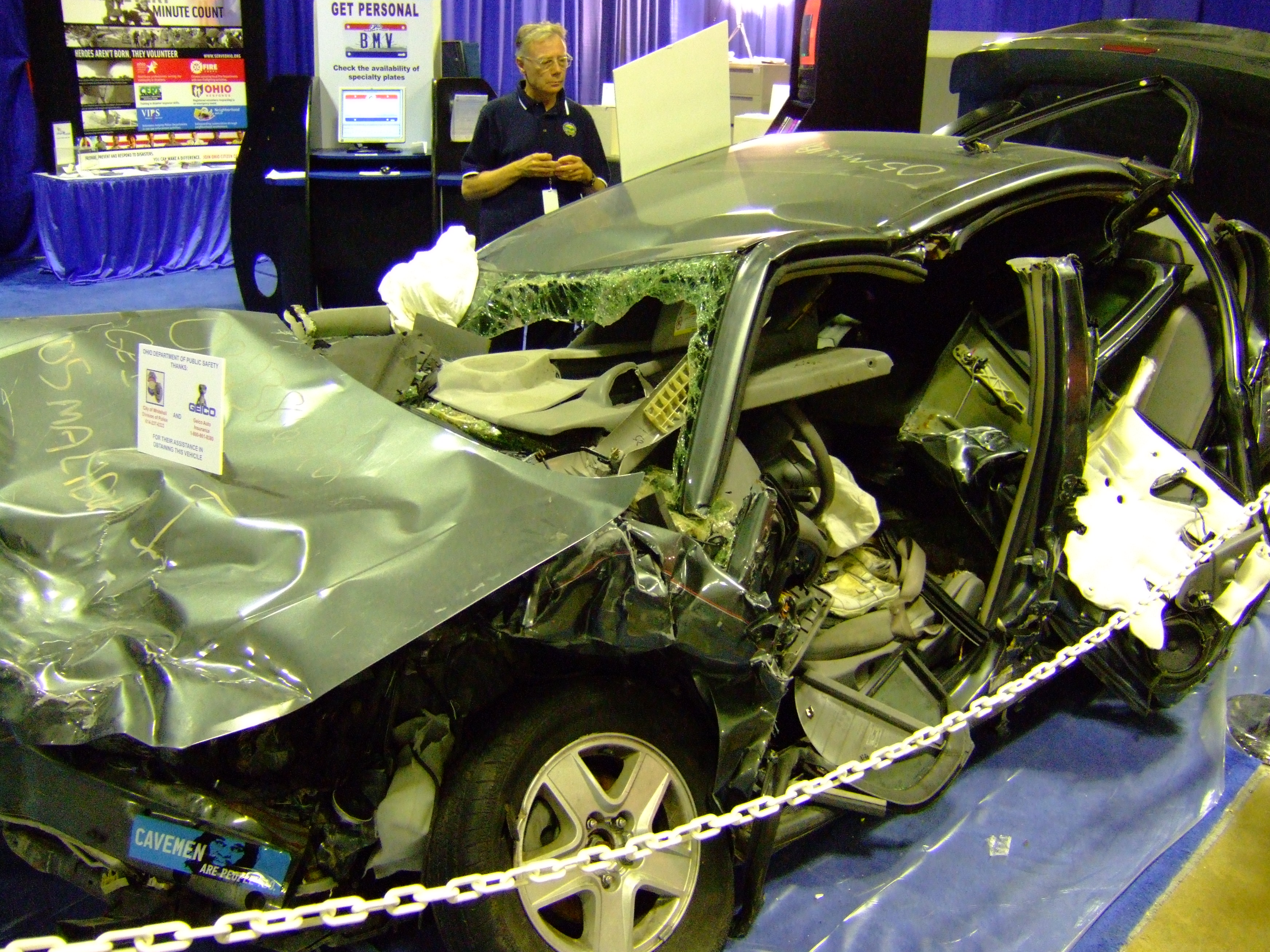
Chevrolet Malibu involved in a rollover crash

Road traffic accidents usually involve impact loading, such as when a car hits a traffic bollard, water hydrant or tree, the damage being localized to the impact zone. When vehicles collide, the damage increases with the relative velocity of the vehicles, the damage increasing as the square of the velocity since it is the impact kinetic energy (1/2 mv^{2}) which is the variable of importance. Much design effort is made to improve the impact resistance of cars so as to minimize user injury. It can be achieved in several ways: by enclosing the driver and passengers in a safety cell for example. The cell is reinforced so it will survive in high speed crashes, and so protect the users. Parts of the body shell outside the cell are designed to crumple progressively, absorbing most of the kinetic energy which must be dissipated by the impact.

Various impact test are used to assess the effects of high loading, both on products and standard slabs of material. The Charpy test and Izod test are two examples of standardized methods which are used widely for testing materials. Ball or projectile drop tests are used for assessing product impacts.

The Columbia disaster was caused by impact damage when a chunk of polyurethane foam impacted the carbon fibre composite wing of the Space Shuttle. Although tests had been conducted before the disaster, the test chunks were much smaller than the chunk that fell away from the booster rocket and hit the exposed wing.

When fragile items are shipped, impacts and drops can cause product damage. Protective packaging and cushioning help reduce the peak acceleration by extending the duration of the shock or impact.

== See also ==
- Charpy impact test
- Coefficient of restitution
- Compression (physical)
- Cushioning
- Fall factor
- Impact driver
- Impact sensor
- Impact wrench
- Impulse (physics)
- Izod impact strength test
- Jerk (physics)
- Road traffic accident
- Shock
- Shock data logger
- Tension (physics)
- Write-off
