= Südliches Höllhorn =

Summit in the Allgäu Alps

Coordinates: 47°21′31″N 10°23′13″E

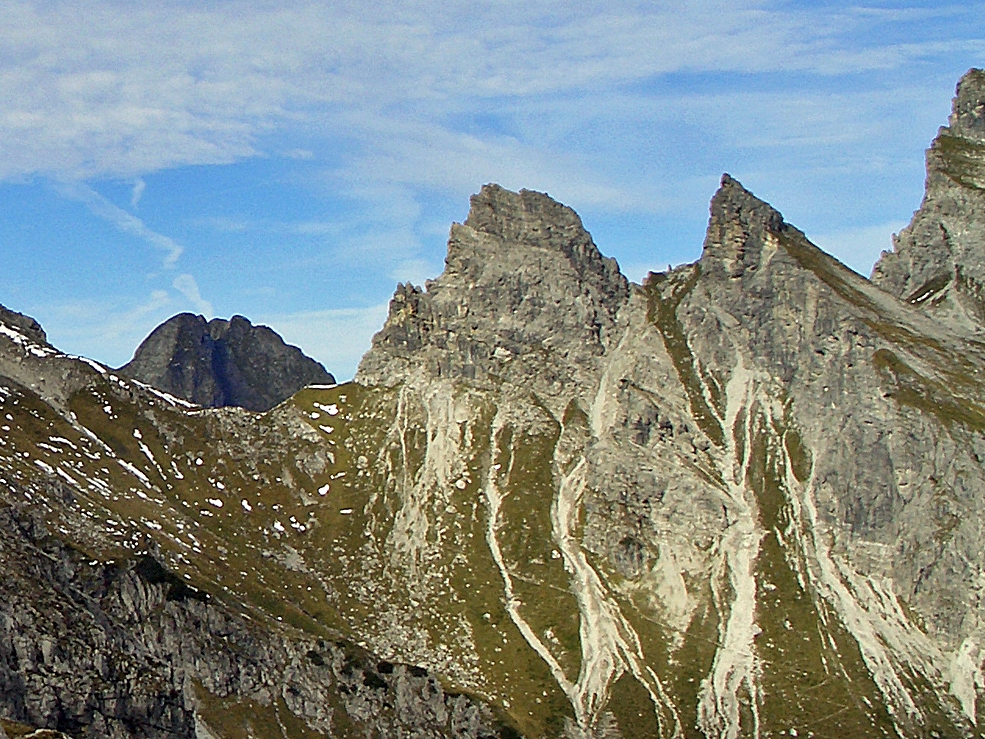
- Südliches Höllhorn (2145 m) and Nördliches Höllhorn (2145 m), behind them the summits of the Höfats (2259 m).

Highest point
- Elevation: 2,145 m (7,037 ft)

Naming
- Language of name: German

Geography
- Location within Europe
- Location: Between Bavaria, Germany and Tyrol, Austria

Geology
- Mountain type: Summit

Südliches Höllhorn is a subpeak of Höllhörner, which is a part of the wildengruppe of the Allgäu Alps. Südliches Höllhorn is 2145 meters (7037 feet) above sea level. Südliches Höllhorn has 3 main access points. The subpeak is between Bavaria, Germany, and Tyrol, Austria.

Südliches Höllhorn sits south of the Nördliches Höllhorn. Together, Nördliches Höllhorn and Südliches Höllhorn form the Höllhörner range. In between both of the subpeaks is a pass. The subpeaks together are often described to look like horns when viewed from certain vantage points.

The subpeaks first documented tourist climb was in 1892, though it is believed that shepherds would use the pass before that. The rocks of Südliches Höllhorn, as well as Nördliches Höllhorn is often described as rocky and brittle.

== Access Routes ==
There are 3 ways to reach the subpeak of Südliches Höllhorn. Each of the routes to reach the top begin at Hornbachjoch.

=== Normal Route ===
The normal route is the least difficult route taken. It takes around 45 minutes to reach the subpeak from this route. This route is graded a low 5th class on the YDS scale.

=== South Ridge ===
The South Ridge route is the most popular route taken. This route takes an hour and a half to reach the top. It is graded a mid 5th class on the YDS scale.

=== West Pillar ===
The West Pillar route is the least taken route out of the 3. This route is graded high fifth class on the YDS scale.

== History of Ascents ==
Its believed that shepherds from on the east side of Wildenstock would use the pass between Südliches Höllhorn and Nördliches Höllhorn for the transportation of sheep.

The first recorded tourist ascent was in 1892, by Stritzl and Kranzfelder, who climbed both Südliches Höllhorn and Nördliches Höllhorn together. Later, in 1902, the west face was ascended by E. Heimhuber and Dr. Madlener. In 1920 and 1921 the southwest face was climbed by O. Huber and Gen.
