= August Karl Rosiwal =

August Karl Rosiwal (2 December 1860 – 9 October 1923) was an Austrian geologist.

Rosiwal was born and died in Vienna. From 1885 to 1891, he worked as an assistant to Franz Toula. In 1892 he began lecturing in mineralogy and petrography and then from 1898 finally earning fees from his lectures. Many of the studies self conducted. From 1918 until his death in 1923, he was administrator of the "Geological Institute of the University of Vienna", following his mentor Franz Toula. He conducted a comprehensive dating, geological details of Austria.

His legacy includes the Rosiwal scale and the Rosiwal method, which is basically a method of petrographic analysis and led to the development of the stereograph.

The Rosiwal method (also called Delesse and Rosiwal) attempts to perform a quantitative analysis of the amounts of individual minerals that make up a rock (see modal analysis). It applies only to metamorphic rocks. It consists of calculations based on proportions drawn lines very close together and act on the different materials, this measure is calculated proportionally to the area and volume of each material.

== Works ==
- Geological map of the environs of Karlovy Vary with demarcation of closer and broader protective zone of thermal springs and zone of spa resort, (1894)
- Geological map of the Karlovy Vary area, (1895)
- On new measures to be taken to protect the Karlovy Vary thermal springs, (1895)
- On thermal waters of Karlovy Vary and their protection, (1895)
- Geological special map of the Kingdom and countries constituting the Austro-Hungarian Empire, (1914)
- Geological special map of the Kingdom and countries constituting the Austro-Hungarian Empire, Polička a Nové Město na Moravě, (1914)
