= Brittleness =

Liability of breakage from stress without significant plastic deformation

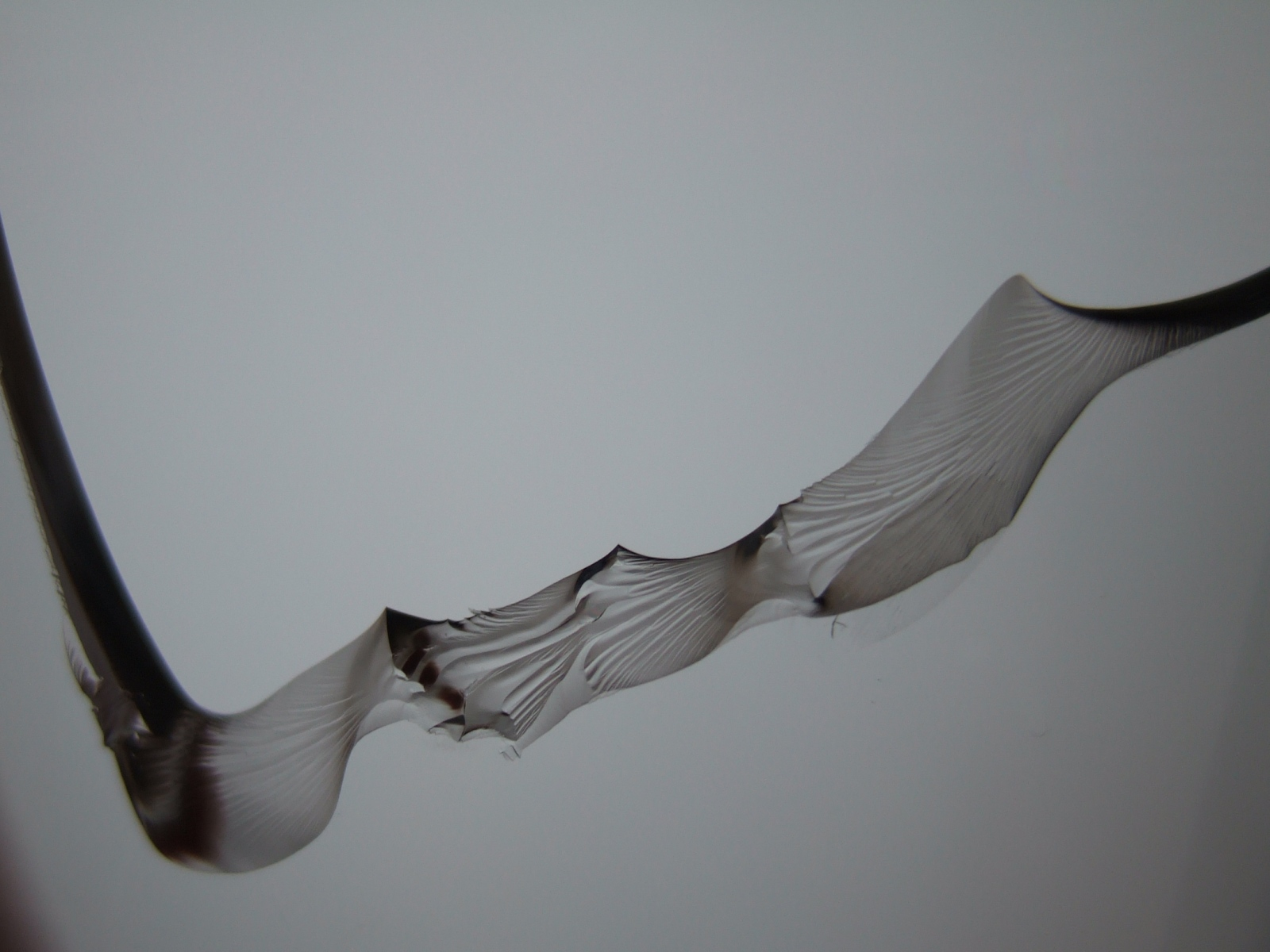
Brittle fracture in glass

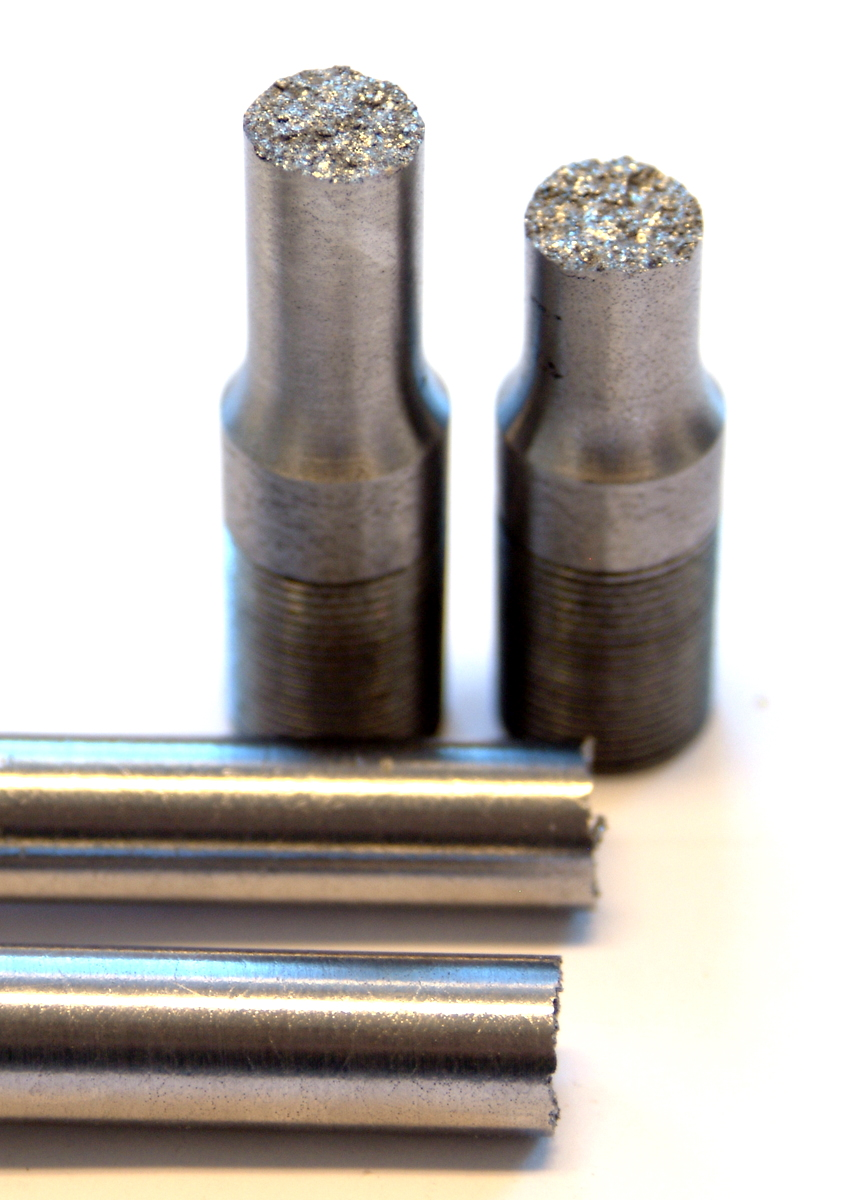
Brittle fracture in cast iron tensile testpieces

A material is brittle if, when subjected to stress, it fractures with little elastic deformation and without significant plastic deformation. Brittle materials absorb relatively little energy prior to fracture, even those of high strength. Breaking is often accompanied by a sharp snapping sound.

When used in materials science, it is generally applied to materials that fail when there is little or no plastic deformation before failure. One proof is to match the broken halves, which should fit exactly since no plastic deformation has occurred.

== Brittleness in different materials ==
=== Polymers ===
Mechanical characteristics of polymers can be sensitive to temperature changes near room temperatures. For example, poly(methyl methacrylate) is extremely brittle at temperature 4˚C, but experiences increased ductility with increased temperature.

Amorphous polymers are polymers that can behave differently at different temperatures. They may behave like a glass at low temperatures (the glassy region), a rubbery solid at intermediate temperatures (the leathery or glass transition region), and a viscous liquid at higher temperatures (the rubbery flow and viscous flow region). This behavior is known as viscoelastic behavior. In the glassy region, the amorphous polymer will be rigid and brittle. With increasing temperature, the polymer will become less brittle.

=== Metals ===
Some metals show brittle characteristics due to their slip systems. The more slip systems a metal has, the less brittle it is, because plastic deformation can occur along many of these slip systems. Conversely, with fewer slip systems, less plastic deformation can occur, and the metal will be more brittle. For example, HCP (hexagonal close packed) metals have few active slip systems, and are typically brittle.

=== Ceramics ===
Ceramics are generally brittle due to the difficulty of dislocation motion, or slip. There are few slip systems in crystalline ceramics that a dislocation is able to move along, which makes deformation difficult and makes the ceramic more brittle.

Ceramic materials generally exhibit ionic bonding. Because of the ions’ electric charge and their repulsion of like-charged ions, slip is further restricted.

== Changing brittle materials ==
Materials can be changed to become more brittle or less brittle.

=== Toughening ===
Graph comparing stress–strain curves for brittle and ductile materials

When a material has reached the limit of its strength, it usually has the option of either deformation or fracture. A naturally malleable metal can be made stronger by impeding the mechanisms of plastic deformation (reducing grain size, precipitation hardening, work hardening, etc.), but if this is taken to an extreme, fracture becomes the more likely outcome, and the material can become brittle. Improving material toughness is, therefore, a balancing act.

Naturally brittle materials, such as glass, are not difficult to toughen effectively. Most such techniques involve one of two mechanisms: to deflect or absorb the tip of a propagating crack or to create carefully controlled residual stresses so that cracks from certain predictable sources will be forced closed. The first principle is used in laminated glass where two sheets of glass are separated by an interlayer of polyvinyl butyral. The polyvinyl butyral, as a viscoelastic polymer, absorbs the growing crack. The second method is used in toughened glass and pre-stressed concrete. A demonstration of glass toughening is provided by Prince Rupert's Drop. Brittle polymers can be toughened by using metal particles to initiate crazes when a sample is stressed, a good example being high-impact polystyrene or HIPS. The least brittle structural ceramics are silicon carbide (mainly by virtue of its high strength) and transformation-toughened zirconia.

A different philosophy is used in composite materials, where brittle glass fibers, for example, are embedded in a ductile matrix such as polyester resin. When strained, cracks are formed at the glass–matrix interface, but so many are formed that much energy is absorbed and the material is thereby toughened. The same principle is used in creating metal matrix composites.

=== Effect of pressure ===
Generally, the brittle strength of a material can be increased by pressure. This happens as an example in the brittle–ductile transition zone at an approximate depth of 10 kilometres (6.2 mi) in the Earth's crust, at which rock becomes less likely to fracture, and more likely to deform ductilely (see rheid).

== Crack growth ==
Supersonic fracture is crack motion faster than the speed of sound in a brittle material. This phenomenon was first discovered by scientists from the Max Planck Institute for Metals Research in Stuttgart (Markus J. Buehler and Huajian Gao) and IBM Almaden Research Center in San Jose, California (Farid F. Abraham).

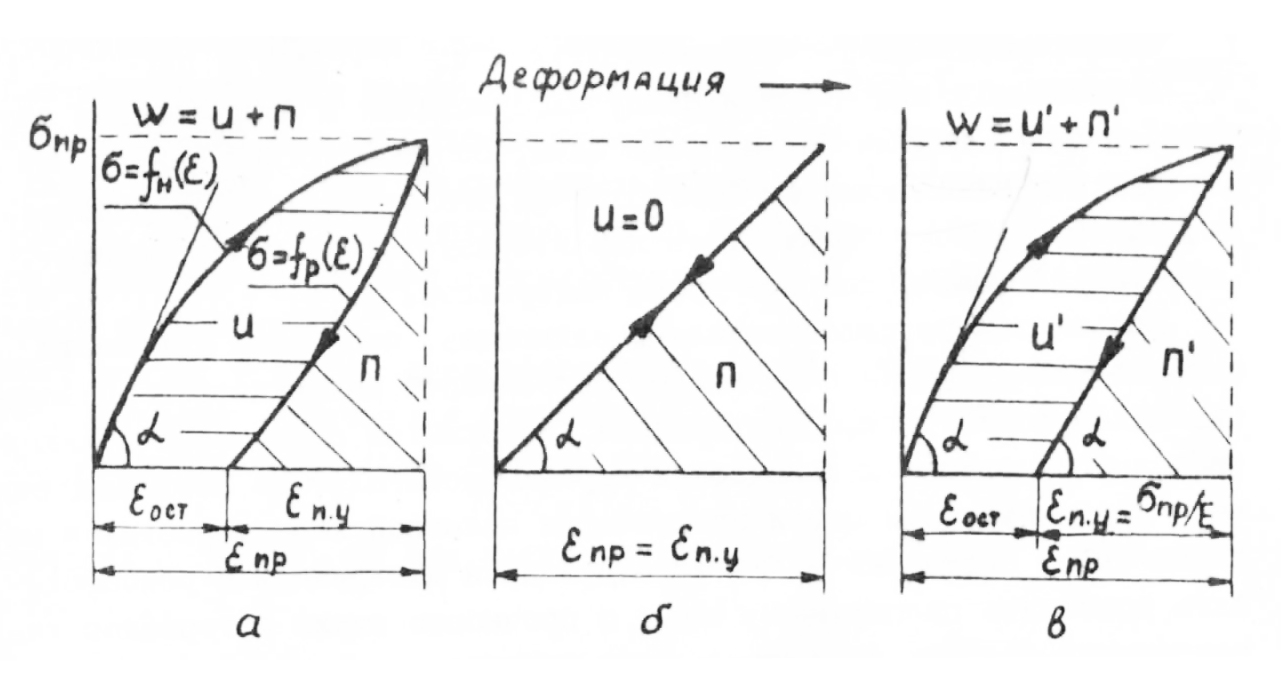
Brittleness diagrams titled "Deformation" (Russian: деформация)

== See also ==
- Charpy impact test
- Ductility
- Forensic engineering
- Fractography
- Izod impact strength test
- Software brittleness
- Strengthening mechanisms of materials
- Toughness
