= Rosiwal scale =

Hardness scale in mineralogy

The Rosiwal scale is a hardness scale in mineralogy, with its name given in memory of the Austrian geologist August Karl Rosiwal. The Rosiwal scale attempts to give more quantitative values of scratch hardness, unlike the Mohs scale which is a qualitative measurement with relative values.

The Rosiwal method (also called the Delesse-Rosiwal method) is a method of petrographic analysis and is performed by scratching a polished surface under a known load using a scratch-tip with a known geometry. The hardness is calculated by finding the volume of removed material, but this measurement can be difficult and must sample a large enough number of grain in order to have statistical significance.

== Rosiwal scale values ==
Mohs	Mineral	Rosiwal hardness
1	Talc	0.03
2	Gypsum	1.25
3	Calcite	4.5
4	Fluorite	5
5	Apatite	5.5
6	Feldspar	37
7	Quartz	100
8	Topaz	175
9	Corundum	1,000
10	Diamond	140,000

Measures the scratch hardness of a mineral expressed on a quantitative scale. These measurements must be performed in a laboratory, since the surfaces must be flat and smooth. The base value of the Rosiwal scale is defined as corundum set to 1000 (unitless).

== See also ==
- Hardness
- August Karl Rosiwal
- Friedrich Mohs
