= Georges Charpy =

French scientist

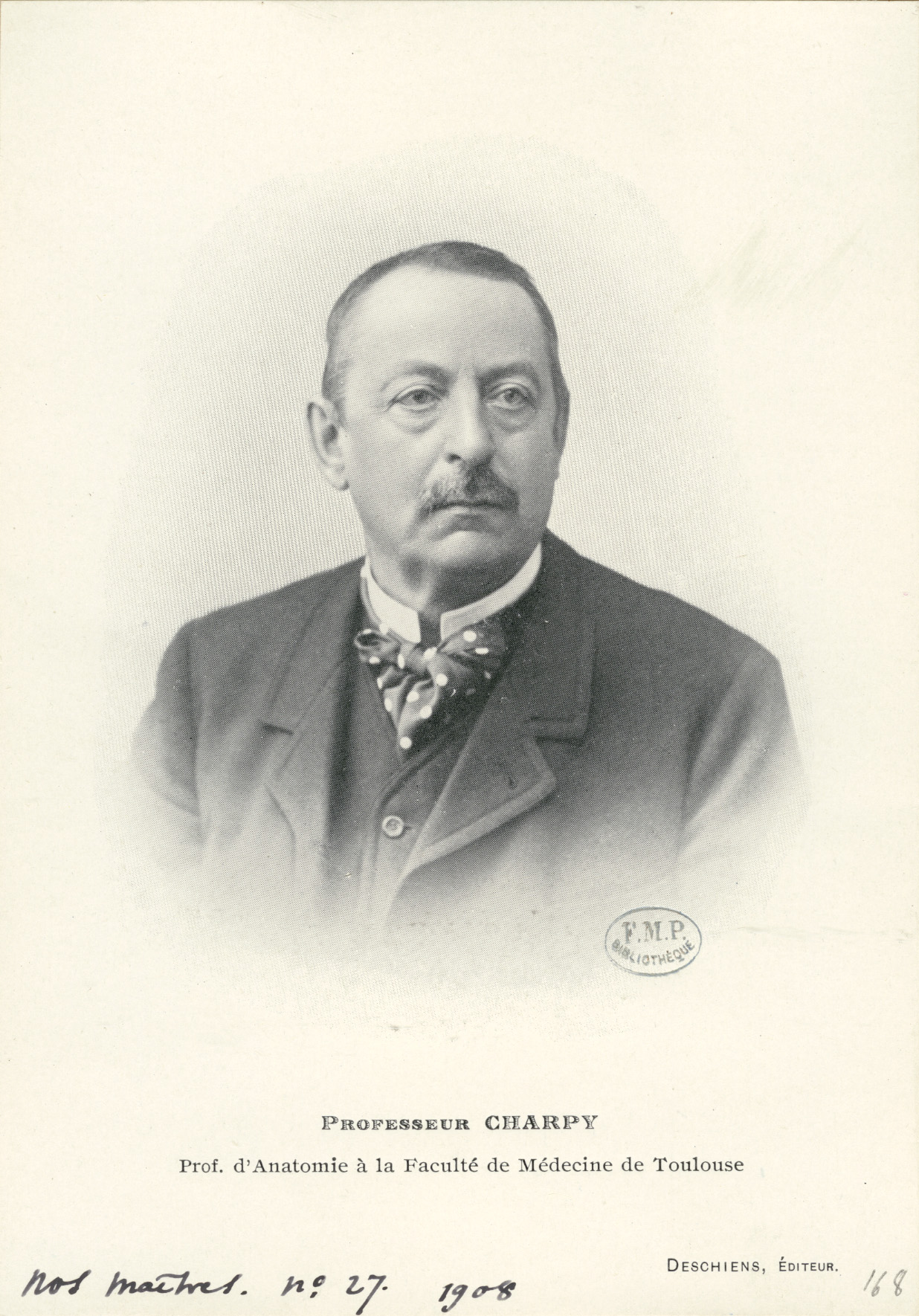
- Born: Augustin Georges Albert Charpy; 1 September 1865; Oullins, Rhône, France
- Died: 25 November 1945 (aged 80); Paris, France
- Known for: Charpy impact test
- Scientific career
- Fields: Mechanical Engineering, Metallurgy, Chemistry, Physics
- Workplaces: École Monge (1887), École Nationale Supérieure des Mines de Paris (1920), École Polytechnique (1922)

Augustin Georges Albert Charpy (1 September 1865 – 25 November 1945) was the French scientist who created the Charpy impact test. He attended École Polytechnique from 1885 to 1887 and graduated with a degree in Marine Artillery. In 1887 he became a professor at École Monge. In 1892 he published his physics thesis. In 1920 he became a professor of metallurgy at École Nationale Supérieure des Mines de Paris. In 1922 he became the professor of general chemistry at École Polytechnique. He died of a heart attack in Paris, France.
