= Nördliches Höllhorn =

Summit in the Allgäu Alps

Coordinates: 47°21′31″N 10°23′13″E

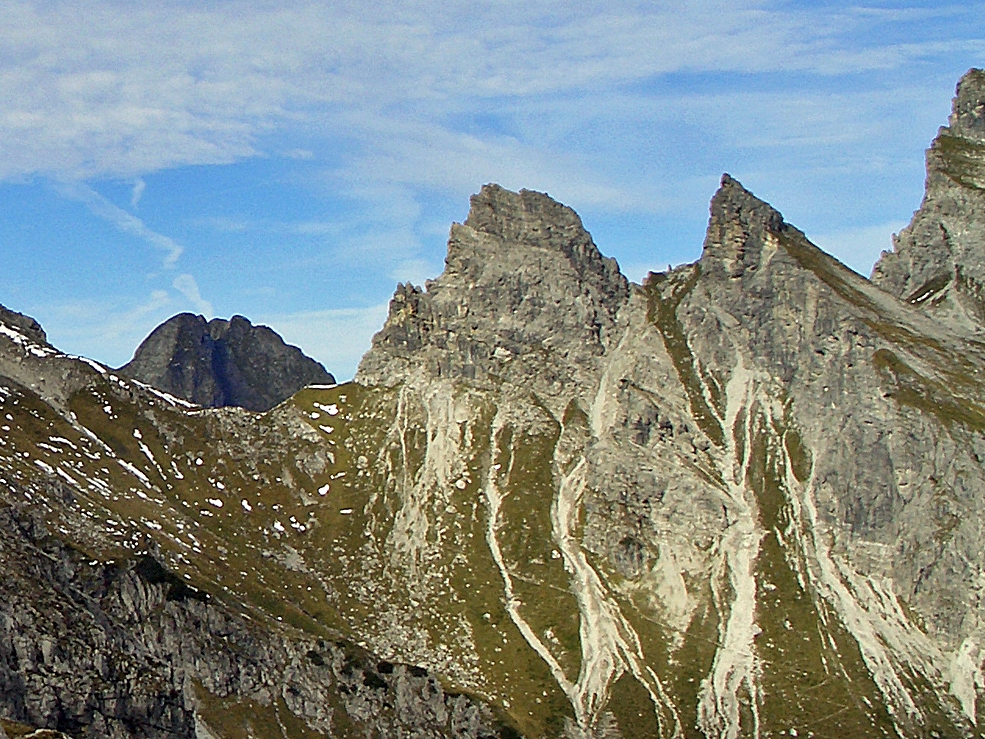
- Nördliches Höllhorn among other mountain tops

Highest point
- Elevation: 2,145 m (7,037 ft)

Naming
- Language of name: German

Geography
- Location within Austria
- Location: Between Bavaria, Germany and Tyrol, Austria

Geology
- Mountain type: Subpeak

Nördliches Höllhorn is a subpeak of Höllhörner, which is apart of the wildengruppe of the Allgäu Alps. Nördliches Höllhorn is about 2145 meters (7037 feet) above sea level. It is located between Bavaria, Germany, and Tyrol, Austria. There are two routes to the top of the subpeak.

Nördliches Höllhorn is north of Südliches Höllhorn. Together, they form the Höllhörner range. The Höllhörner range is often described to look like devil horns from certain vantage points. In between both subpeaks is a notch, sepearating the two.

== Access Routes ==
Theres are 2 routes to reach the top of the subpeak. Neither of them have a marked hiking path.

==== Wildenscharte ====
This route begins in Wildenscharte, it takes about 1 hour to reach the top of the subpeak. It is graded a low 5th class on the YDS scale.

==== South face route ====
This route begins in the notch between Nördliches Höllhorn and Südliches Höllhorn. It takes roughly half an hour to reach the top of the subpeak. This route requires about 1.5 pitches of rope. It is graded a mid 5th class on the YDS scale.
