= Barcol hardness test =

The Barcol hardness test characterizes the indentation hardness of materials through the depth of penetration of an indentor, loaded on a material sample and compared to the penetration in a reference material. The method is most often used for composite materials such as reinforced thermosetting resins or to determine how much a resin or plastic has cured. The test complements the measurement of glass transition temperature, as an indirect measure of the degree of cure of a composite. It is inexpensive and quick, and provides information on the cure throughout a part.

== Barcol impressor ==
Originally called the Barber-Colman Impressor, the Barcol impressor was developed by Walter Colman as a hand-held, portable means of assessing the hardness of a material during World War II. The United States Army Air Corps required a hand-held method of checking the hardness of rivets due to concerns that aircraft could be sabotaged by replacing normal rivets with soft lead or wooden ones which would fail during flight. The impressor operates when the tip is pressed against the material in question. The hardness of the material determines how far the tip indents and this is transferred by a tension spring and lever to be read on a dial.

== Operation ==
The Barcol hardness test is generally used on soft materials such as rigid plastics. It measures hardness based on indentation of a sharp point with a flat tip. The test is performed using a similar method and indentation device as that used to measure Shore D hardness, however the Shore D indentor has a round tip. Barcol hardness is not a valid hardness measure for curved surfaces.

== Scales and values ==
The governing standard for the Barcol hardness test is ASTM D 2583. Barcol hardness is measured on a scale from 0 to 100 with the typical range being between 50B and 90B. A measurement of 60B is roughly equivalent to a Shore hardness of 80D or a Rockwell hardness M100. As defined in ASTM D 2583 the scale divisions from 0-100 should each indicate a depth of 0.0076 mm or the equivalent 0.0003 inches.

== See also ==
- Brinell hardness test
- Knoop hardness test
- Rockwell scale
- Shore durometer
- Vickers hardness test
- Hardness comparison
