= Izod impact strength test =

Equipment and procedure to determine materials' impact resistance

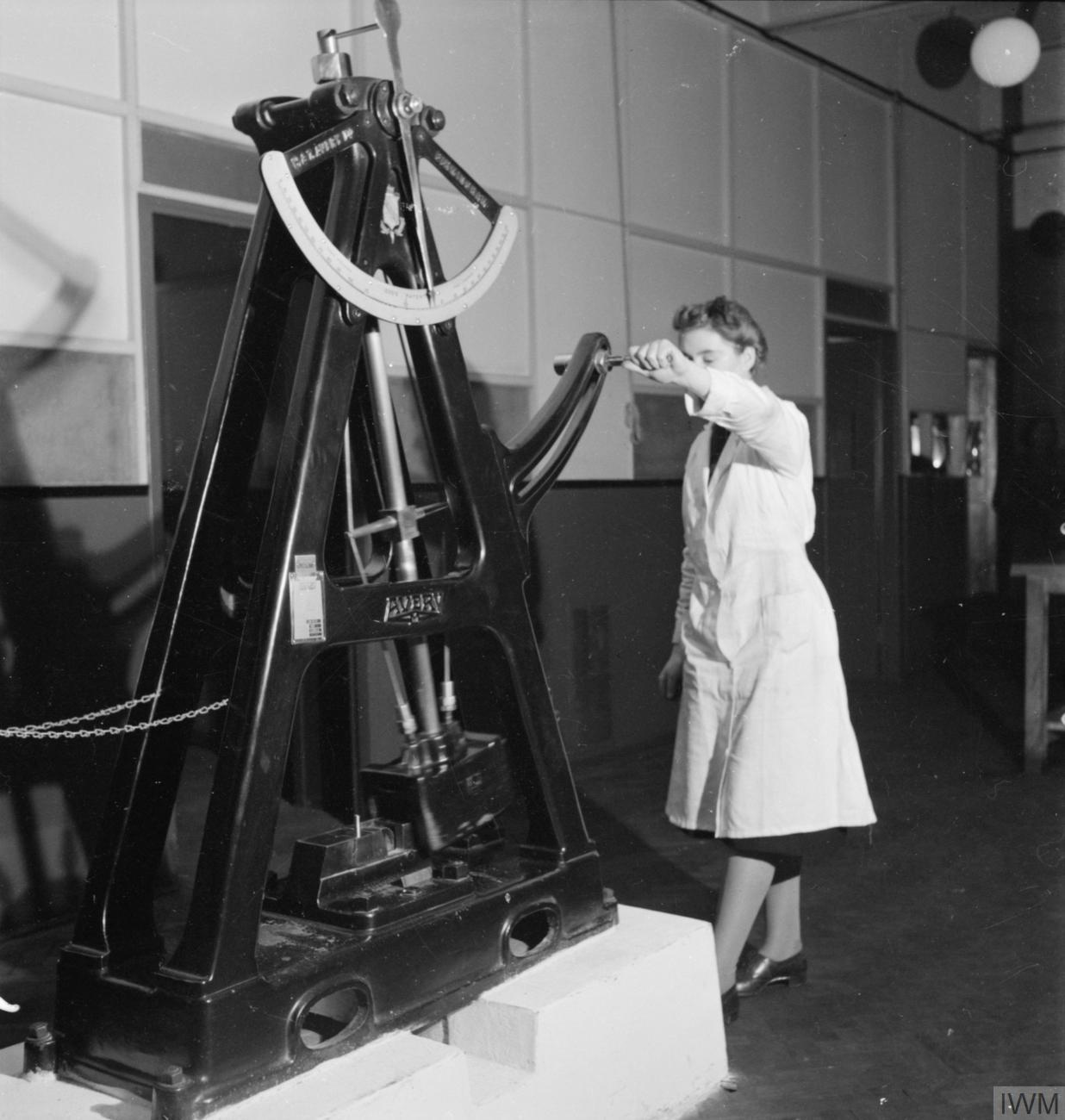
A factory worker performing an Izod impact strength test in 1942

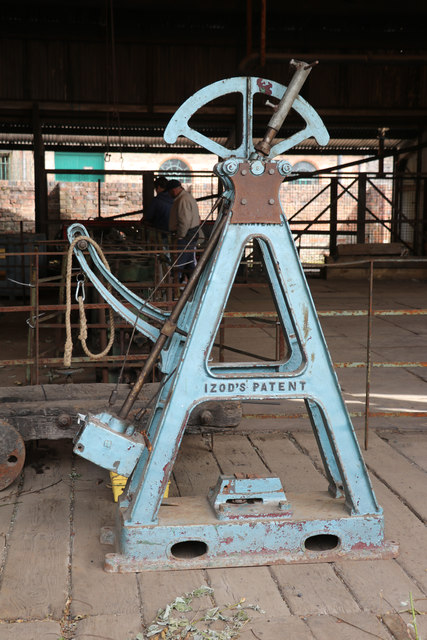
Izod impact tester in Blists Hill Victorian Town

The Izod impact strength test is an ASTM standard method of determining the impact resistance of materials. A pivoting arm is raised to a specific height (constant potential energy) and then released. The arm swings down, hitting a notched sample, breaking the specimen. The energy absorbed by the sample is calculated from the height the arm swings to after hitting the sample. A notched sample is generally used to determine impact energy and notch sensitivity.

The test is similar to the Charpy impact test but uses a different arrangement of the specimen under test. The Izod impact test differs from the Charpy impact test in that the sample is held in a cantilevered beam configuration as opposed to a three-point bending configuration.

The test is named after the English engineer Edwin Gilbert Izod (1876–1946), who described it in his 1903 address to the British Association, subsequently published in Engineering.

== The need for impact tests ==
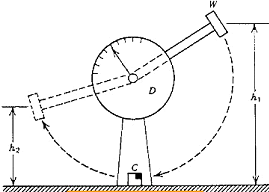
Scheme for the determination of Izod impact strength test results.

Impact, by definition, is a large force applied for a very short time, resulting in a sudden transfer of momentum and energy, and its effect is different when the same amount of energy is transferred more gradually. Everyday engineering structures are subjected to it and may develop cracks that, over time, propagate to a point where catastrophic failure would result.

Impact tests are used in comparing the shear fracture toughness of various materials under the same test conditions, or of one material versus temperature to determine its ductile-to-brittle transition temperature where a steep descent in impact strength with decreasing temperature is observed.

A material's toughness is a factor of its ability to absorb energy during relatively slow plastic deformation, though the rate at which strain occurs matters. Brittle materials have low toughness as a result of the small amount of plastic deformation they can endure at any rate. However, ductile materials may behave like brittle materials under high-energy impact, hence the need for this kind of test.

The test conditions are governed by many variables, most importantly:

- the dimensions of the usually rectangular cross section of the sample below the notch;
- the height of the hammer at the start position, determining its velocity at impact;
- the mass of the hammer which together with the velocity determines its kinetic energy at impact;
- the sharpness, or tip curvature, of the notch;
- the temperature of the sample.

== Data acquisition ==
In 1973, Sands Whiteley Research and Development did a project for the TRRL (Transport and Road Research Laboratory in UK) and the University of Surrey. David Sands of Sands Whiteley R&D applied strain gauges to the hammer. These went to a strain gauge amplifier then to analog to digital converters loading results directly into a Texas 960B computer using DMA (direct memory access). The system was able to take a million measurements per second. Researchers at the University of Surrey were able to print out curves of the impact.

== ASTM test for plastics ==
The ASTM International standard for Izod Impact testing of plastics is ASTM D256. The results are expressed in energy lost per unit of thickness (such as ft·lb/in or J/cm) at the notch. Alternatively, the results may be reported as energy lost per unit cross-sectional area at the notch (J/m^{2} or ft·lb/in^{2}). In Europe, ISO 180 methods are used and results are based only on the cross-sectional area at the notch (J/m^{2}). The dimensions of a standard specimen for ASTM D256 are 63.5 × 12.7 × 3.2 mm (2.5 × 0.5 × 0.125 in). The most common specimen thickness is 3.2 mm (0.13 in), but the width can vary between 3.0 and 12.7 mm (0.12 and 0.50 in).

== See also ==
- Impact force
- Fracture mechanics
- Shock (mechanics)
