= Ductility =

Degree to which a material under stress irreversibly deforms before failure

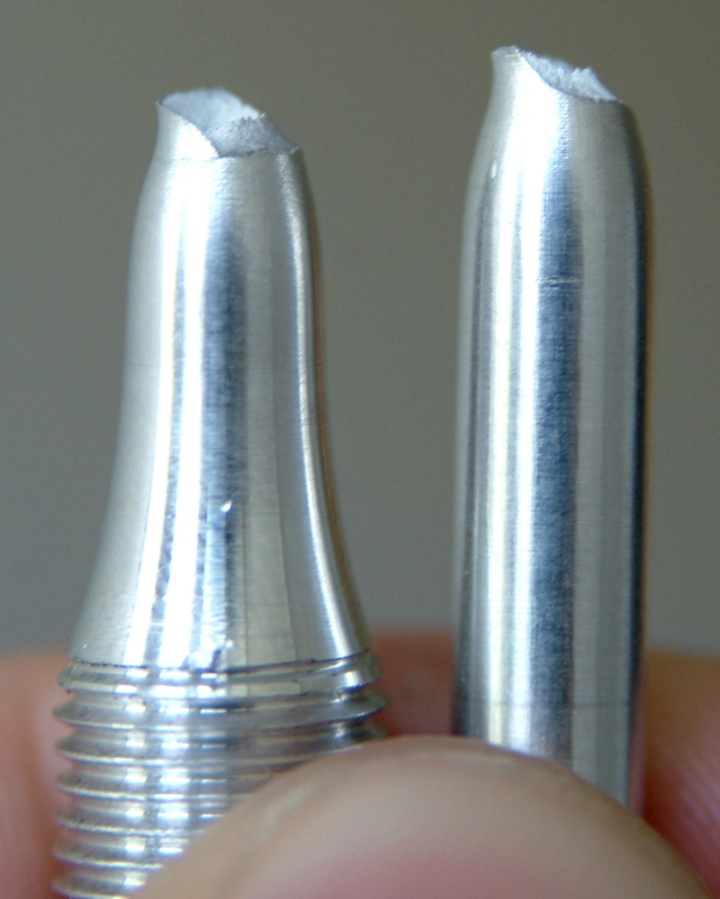
Tensile test of an Al-Mg-Si alloy. The local necking and the cup and cone fracture surfaces are typical for ductile metals.

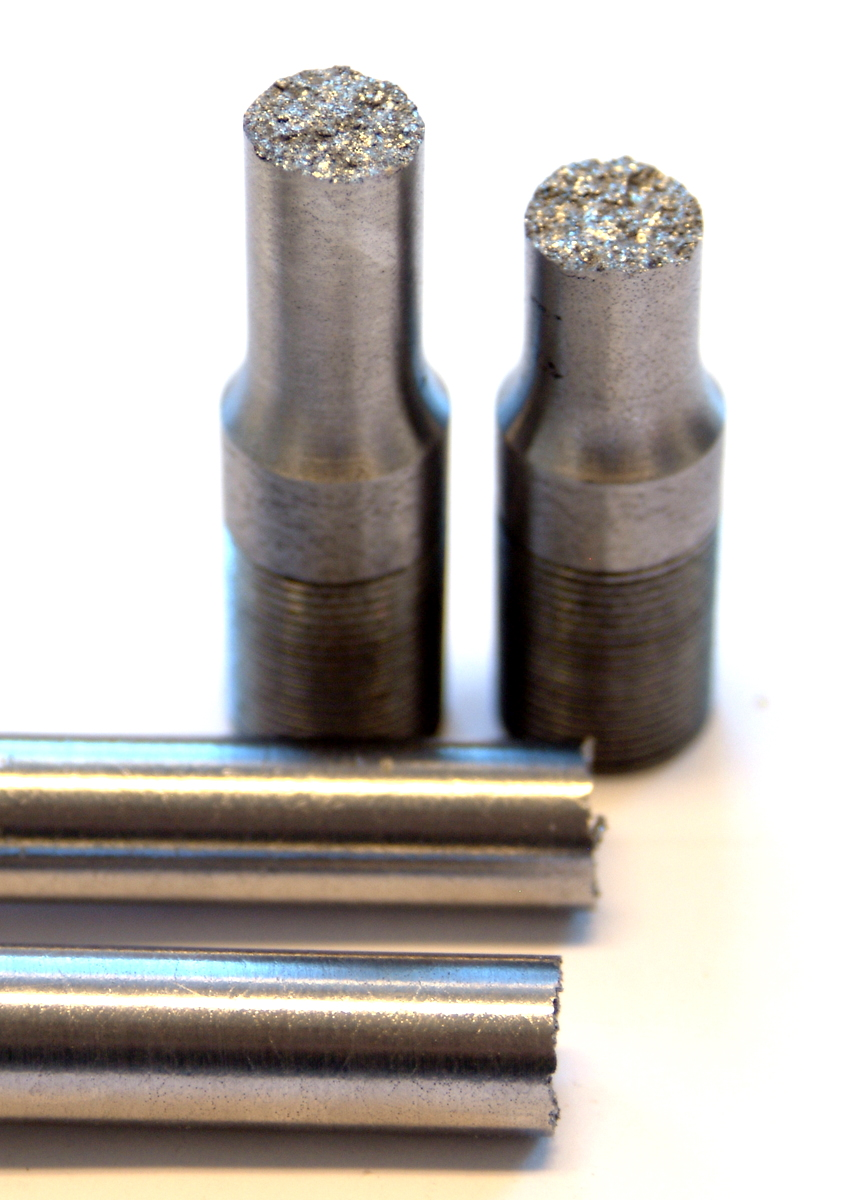
This tensile test of a nodular cast iron demonstrates low ductility.

Ductility is the ability of a material to sustain significant plastic deformation before fracture when undergoing tension, i.e. when the relevant elastic modulus is Young's; the equivalent for deforming under bulk compression, i.e. when using the bulk modulus, is malleability. Historically, materials were considered malleable if they were amenable to forming by hammering or rolling. Lead is an example of a material which is substantially more malleable than ductile. Plastic deformation is the permanent distortion of a material under applied stress, as opposed to elastic deformation, which is reversible upon removing the stress. Ductility is a critical mechanical performance indicator, particularly in applications that require materials to bend, stretch, or deform in other ways without breaking. The extent of ductility can be quantitatively assessed using the percent elongation at break, given by the equation:

$$\% \mathrm{EL}= \left ( \frac{l_{\mathrm f}-l_0}{l_0} \right )\times100\%$$

where $l_{\mathrm f}$ is the length of the material after fracture and $l_0$ is the original length before testing. This formula helps in quantifying how much a material can stretch under tensile stress before failure, providing key insights into its ductile behavior. Ductility is an important consideration in engineering and manufacturing. It defines a material's suitability for certain manufacturing operations (such as cold working) and its capacity to absorb mechanical overload like in an engine. Some metals that are generally described as ductile include gold and copper, while platinum is the most ductile of all metals in pure form. However, not all metals experience ductile failure, as some experience brittle failure instead, such as cast iron. Polymers can generally be viewed as ductile materials, as they typically allow for plastic deformation.

Inorganic materials, including a wide variety of ceramics and semiconductors, are generally characterized by their brittleness. This brittleness primarily stems from their strong ionic or covalent bonds, which maintain the atoms in a rigid, densely packed arrangement. Such a rigid lattice structure restricts the movement of atoms or dislocations, essential for plastic deformation. The significant difference in ductility observed between metals and inorganic semiconductor or insulator can be traced back to each material's inherent characteristics, including the nature of their defects, such as dislocations, and their specific chemical bonding properties. Consequently, unlike ductile metals and some organic materials with ductility (%EL) from 1.2% to over 1200%, brittle inorganic semiconductors and ceramic insulators typically show much smaller ductility at room temperature.

== Materials science ==
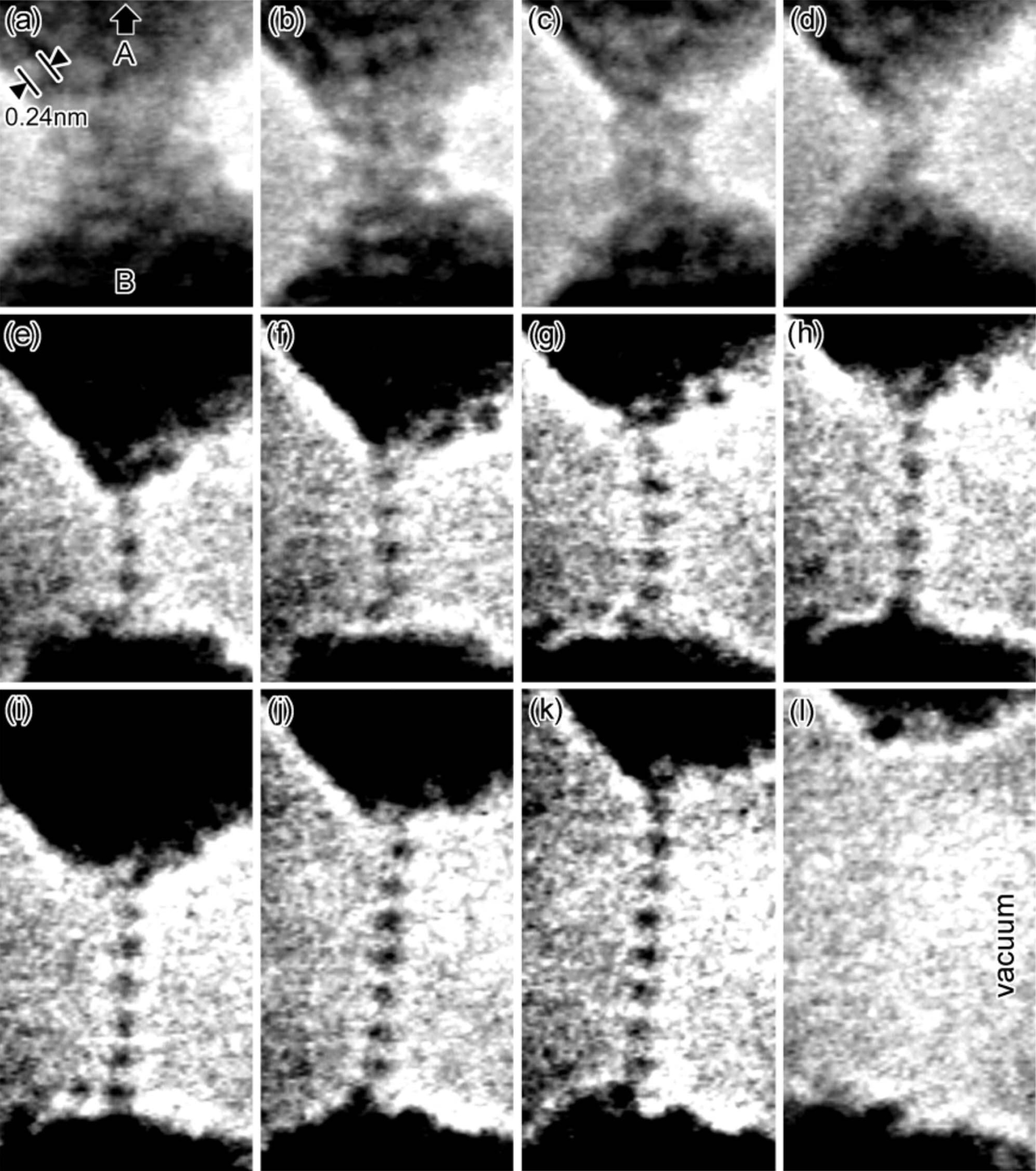
Gold is extremely ductile. It can be drawn into a monatomic wire, and then stretched more before it breaks.

Ductility is especially important in metalworking, as materials that crack, break or shatter under stress cannot be manipulated using metal-forming processes such as hammering, rolling, drawing or extruding. Malleable materials can be formed cold using stamping or pressing, whereas brittle materials may be cast or thermoformed.

High degrees of ductility occur due to metallic bonds, which are found predominantly in metals; this leads to the common perception that metals are ductile in general. In metallic bonds valence shell electrons are delocalized and shared between many atoms. The delocalized electrons allow metal atoms to slide past one another without being subjected to strong repulsive forces that would cause other materials to shatter.

The ductility of steel varies depending on the alloying constituents. Increasing the levels of carbon decreases ductility. Many plastics and amorphous solids, such as Play-Doh, are also malleable. Gold is the most malleable metal, while platinum is the most ductile of the pure metals. When highly stretched, such metals distort via formation, reorientation and migration of dislocations and crystal twins without noticeable hardening.

== Quantification ==
=== Basic definitions ===
The quantities commonly used to define ductility in a tension test are relative elongation (in percent, sometimes denoted as $\varepsilon_{\mathrm f}$) and reduction of area (sometimes denoted as $q$) at fracture. Fracture strain is the engineering strain at which a test specimen fractures during a uniaxial tensile test. Percent elongation, or engineering strain at fracture, can be written as:

$$\%\mathrm{EL} = \frac{\text{final gauge length - initial gauge length}}{\text{initial gauge length}} = \frac{l_{\mathrm f} - l_0}{l_0} \cdot 100\%$$

Percent reduction in area can be written as:

$$\%\mathrm{RA} = \frac{\text{change in area}}{\text{original area}} = \frac{A_0 - A_{\mathrm f}}{A_0} \cdot 100\%$$

where the area of concern is the cross-sectional area of the gauge of the specimen.

According to Shigley's Mechanical Engineering Design, 'significant' denotes about 5.0 percent elongation.

=== Effect of sample dimensions ===
An important point concerning the value of the ductility (nominal strain at failure) in a tensile test is that it commonly exhibits a dependence on sample dimensions. However, a universal parameter should exhibit no such dependence (and, indeed, there is no dependence for properties such as stiffness, yield stress and ultimate tensile strength). This occurs because the measured strain (displacement) at fracture commonly incorporates contributions from both the uniform deformation occurring up to the onset of necking and the subsequent deformation of the neck (during which there is little or no deformation in the rest of the sample). The significance of the contribution from neck development depends on the "aspect ratio" (length / diameter) of the gauge length, being greater when the ratio is low. This is a simple geometric effect, which has been clearly identified. There have been both experimental studies and theoretical explorations of the effect, mostly based on Finite Element Method (FEM) modelling. Nevertheless, it is not universally appreciated and, since the range of sample dimensions in common use is quite wide, it can lead to highly significant variations (by factors of up to 2 or 3) in ductility values obtained for the same material in different tests.

A more meaningful representation of ductility would be obtained by identifying the strain at the onset of necking, which should be independent of sample dimensions. This point can be difficult to identify on a (nominal) stress-strain curve, because the peak (representing the onset of necking) is often relatively flat. Moreover, some (brittle) materials fracture before the onset of necking, such that there is no peak. In practice, for many purposes it is preferable to carry out a different kind of test, designed to evaluate the toughness (energy absorbed during fracture), rather than use ductility values obtained in tensile tests.

In an absolute sense, "ductility" values are therefore virtually meaningless. The actual (true) strain in the neck at the point of fracture bears no direct relation to the raw number obtained from the nominal stress-strain curve; the true strain in the neck is often considerably higher. Also, the true stress at the point of fracture is usually higher than the apparent value according to the plot. The load often drops while the neck develops, but the sectional area in the neck is also dropping (more sharply), so the true stress there is rising. There is no simple way of estimating this value, since it depends on the geometry of the neck. While the true strain at fracture is a genuine indicator of "ductility", it cannot readily be obtained from a conventional tensile test.

The Reduction in Area (RA) is defined as the decrease in sectional area at the neck (usually obtained by measurement of the diameter at one or both of the fractured ends), divided by the original sectional area. It is sometimes stated that this is a more reliable indicator of the "ductility" than the elongation at failure (partly in recognition of the fact that the latter is dependent on the aspect ratio of the gauge length, although this dependence is far from being universally appreciated). There is something in this argument, but the RA is still some way from being a genuinely meaningful parameter. One objection is that it is not easy to measure accurately, particularly with samples that are not circular in section. Rather more fundamentally, it is affected by both the uniform plastic deformation that took place before necking and by the development of the neck. Furthermore, it is sensitive to exactly what happens in the latter stages of necking, when the true strain is often becoming very high and the behavior is of limited significance in terms of a meaningful definition of strength (or toughness). There has again been extensive study of this issue.

=== Poisson's Ratio ===
Richard Christensen, a doctor in engineering mechanics, argues that ductility in an isotropic material can be quantified in terms of poisson's ratio. In particular, he manipulates the formula for converting a material's bulk modulus K to shear modulus G via poisson's ratio ν to determine a "ductility" quantity D:

$$\begin{align}
\frac{G}{K} &= &&\frac{3}{2}\frac{1-2\nu}{1+\nu}\\
d_i &:= &&\left(1-\frac{1-2\nu}{1+\nu}\right)^2\\
D &:= &&3d_i^2 - 2d_i^3 = -\frac{3^5\nu^4\left(5\nu^2-2\nu-1\right)}{(\nu+1)^6}
\end{align}$$

d_{i}, the intermediate "ductility index", involves dropping the 3/2 term to normalize the ratio to normally be from 1.0 to 0 (as ν is usually between 0 and 0.5), taking the difference from 1 so that it scales up instead of down, and then squaring it to make D easier to calculate in terms of it. Because this formula is partially based on the false assumption that ν is always positive, auxetics, such as defective graphene, will have positive D, i.e. more ductility than a material with ν = 0; more "normal" values will have ductility values that directly correlate with poisson's ratio (so a higher value of one implies a higher value of the other, and vice versa). For the non-auxetics Christensen studied, this quantification of ductility appears to be reasonably close to other popular heuristics for quantifying it.

== Ductile–brittle transition temperature ==
Schematic appearance of round metal bars after tensile testing. (a) Brittle fracture (b) Ductile fracture (c) Completely ductile fracture

Metals can undergo two different types of fractures: brittle fracture or ductile fracture. Failure propagation occurs faster in brittle materials due to the ability for ductile materials to undergo plastic deformation. Thus, ductile materials are able to sustain more stress due to their ability to absorb more energy prior to failure than brittle materials are. The plastic deformation results in the material following a modification of the Griffith equation, where the critical fracture stress increases due to the plastic work required to extend the crack adding to the work necessary to form the crack - work corresponding to the increase in surface energy that results from the formation of an additional crack surface. The plastic deformation of ductile metals is important as it can be a sign of the potential failure of the metal. Yet, the point at which the material exhibits a ductile behavior versus a brittle behavior is not only dependent on the material itself but also on the temperature at which the stress is being applied to the material. The temperature where the material changes from brittle to ductile or vice versa is crucial for the design of load-bearing metallic products. The minimum temperature at which the metal transitions from a brittle behavior to a ductile behavior, or from a ductile behavior to a brittle behavior, is known as the ductile-brittle transition temperature (DBTT). Below the DBTT, the material will not be able to plastically deform, and the crack propagation rate increases rapidly leading to the material undergoing brittle failure rapidly. Furthermore, DBTT is important since, once a material is cooled below the DBTT, it has a much greater tendency to shatter on impact instead of bending or deforming (low temperature embrittlement). Thus, the DBTT indicates the temperature at which, as temperature decreases, a material's ability to deform in a ductile manner decreases and so the rate of crack propagation drastically increases. In other words, solids are very brittle at very low temperatures, and their toughness becomes much higher at elevated temperatures.

For more general applications, it is preferred to have a lower DBTT to ensure the material has a wider ductility range. This ensures that sudden cracks are inhibited so that failures in the metal body are prevented. It has been determined that the more slip systems a material has, the wider the range of temperatures ductile behavior is exhibited at. This is due to the slip systems allowing for more motion of dislocations when a stress is applied to the material. Thus, in materials with a lower amount of slip systems, dislocations are often pinned by obstacles leading to strain hardening, which increases the materials strength which makes the material more brittle. For this reason, fcc (face centered cubic) structures are ductile over a wide range of temperatures, bcc (body centered cubic) structures are ductile only at high temperatures, and hcp (hexagonal closest packed) structures are often brittle over wide ranges of temperatures. This leads to each of these structures having different performances as they approach failure (fatigue, overload, and stress cracking) under various temperatures, and shows the importance of the DBTT in selecting the correct material for a specific application. For example, zamak 3 exhibits good ductility at room temperature but shatters when impacted at sub-zero temperatures. DBTT is a very important consideration in selecting materials that are subjected to mechanical stresses. A similar phenomenon, the glass transition temperature, occurs with glasses and polymers, although the mechanism is different in these amorphous materials. The DBTT is also dependent on the size of the grains within the metal, as typically smaller grain size leads to an increase in tensile strength, resulting in an increase in ductility and decrease in the DBTT. This increase in tensile strength is due to the smaller grain sizes resulting in grain boundary hardening occurring within the material, where the dislocations require a larger stress to cross the grain boundaries and continue to propagate throughout the material. It has been shown that by continuing to refine ferrite grains to reduce their size, from 40 microns down to 1.3 microns, that it is possible to eliminate the DBTT entirely so that a brittle fracture never occurs in ferritic steel (as the DBTT required would be below absolute zero).

In some materials, the transition is sharper than others and typically requires a temperature-sensitive deformation mechanism. For example, in materials with a body-centered cubic (bcc) lattice the DBTT is readily apparent, as the motion of screw dislocations is very temperature sensitive because the rearrangement of the dislocation core prior to slip requires thermal activation. This can be problematic for steels with a high ferrite content. This famously resulted in serious hull cracking in Liberty ships in colder waters during World War II, causing many sinkings. DBTT can also be influenced by external factors such as neutron radiation, which leads to an increase in internal lattice defects and a corresponding decrease in ductility and increase in DBTT.

The most accurate method of measuring the DBTT of a material is by fracture testing. Typically four-point bend testing at a range of temperatures is performed on pre-cracked bars of polished material. Two fracture tests are typically utilized to determine the DBTT of specific metals: the Charpy V-Notch test and the Izod test. The Charpy V-notch test determines the impact energy absorption ability or toughness of the specimen by measuring the potential energy difference resulting from the collision between a mass on a free-falling pendulum and the machined V-shaped notch in the sample, resulting in the pendulum breaking through the sample. The DBTT is determined by repeating this test over a variety of temperatures and noting when the resulting fracture changes to a brittle behavior which occurs when the absorbed energy is dramatically decreased. The Izod impact test differs from the Charpy impact test in that the sample is held in a cantilevered beam configuration as opposed to a three-point bending configuration.

For experiments conducted at higher temperatures, dislocation activity increases. At a certain temperature, dislocations shield the crack tip to such an extent that the applied deformation rate is not sufficient for the stress intensity at the crack-tip to reach the critical value for fracture (K_{iC}). The temperature at which this occurs is the ductile–brittle transition temperature. If experiments are performed at a higher strain rate, more dislocation shielding is required to prevent brittle fracture, and the transition temperature is raised.

== See also ==
- Deformation
- Work hardening, which improves ductility in uniaxial tension by delaying the onset of instability
- Strength of materials
