= Charpy impact test =

Method of measuring the amount of energy absorbed by a material during fracture

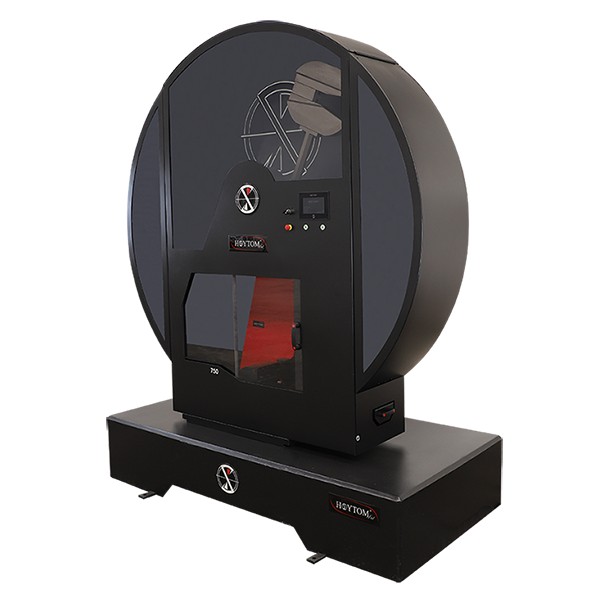
A modern impact test machine.

In materials science, the Charpy impact test, also known as the Charpy V-notch test, is a standardized high strain rate test which determines the amount of energy absorbed by a material during fracture. Absorbed energy is a measure of the material's notch toughness. It is widely used in industry because it is easy to prepare and conduct, and results can be obtained quickly and cheaply. A disadvantage is that some results are only comparative.

The test was developed around 1900 by the American engineer S. B. Russell and the French engineer Georges Charpy, who proposed his standardized version in 1901. It became known as the Charpy test in the early 1900s because of his technical contributions and standardization efforts. It came into widespread use for certification of materials after the 1950s.

== History ==
Before the 19th century, construction mainly used non-metallic materials such as bricks, stones, and wood. As metal began to be used for large-scale structures, including the railway system and industrial boilers, engineers encountered the problem of metal failure. Rail and train-axle failures were particularly dangerous. It was found that metal could fail under repeated cyclic loading, i.e. fatigue, and that fatigue failure occurred when a fracture propagated across the material. Brittle fracture, propagating without plastic deformation, was particularly dangerous because it gave no warning. Engineers therefore searched for ways to measure the mechanical properties of materials under impact, especially in relation to fracture. This was the genesis of the V-notch test.

In 1896, S. B. Russell introduced the idea of residual fracture energy and devised a pendulum fracture test. Russell's initial tests measured un-notched specimens. In 1897, Frémont introduced a test to measure the same phenomenon using a spring-loaded machine. In 1901, Georges Charpy proposed a standardized method improving Russell's by introducing a redesigned pendulum and notched specimen, with precise specifications. Charpy presented his paper at the Budapest Congress on Materials Testing in 1901, and an English translation was reprinted by ASTM in 2000. Unlike Russell, Charpy considered the notch fundamental and standardized its shape. His goal was to classify materials, especially metals, by their resilience. He proposed a mechanical design in 1905 that is essentially the same as the modern apparatus.

At first the test was used internally by some organizations. Later, it became part of the industrial standard, used for publicly certifying the properties of a material. The impetus was the Liberty ships program of World War II. A U.S. Navy Board of Investigation examined 4,694 welded-steel merchant ships built between February 1942 and March 1946. Of these, 970 (over 20%) suffered fractures requiring repair, ranging from minor cracks reparable in the next port to 8 ships abandoned at sea after severe failures. Some Liberty ships, including SS John P. Gaines, broke in half without warning. Remedies including design changes, fabrication changes, and impact-energy requirements on construction steels reduced the fracture rate from over 130 per month in March 1944 to fewer than 5 per month in March 1946, even as the fleet grew from 2,600 to 4,400 ships.

After the war, the National Bureau of Standards (now NIST) released a report in 1948 that examined plates recovered from failed ships using chemical analysis, tensile tests, microstructural examination, and Charpy impact tests. A notable finding was that plates where the fracture had arrested had consistently higher impact energies and lower transition temperatures than plates where the fracture originated. No similar correlation existed against chemical composition, static tensile properties (all steels met the ABS strength requirements), or microstructure. The report first established $15~\mathrm{ft \cdot lbf} \approx 20~\mathrm{J}$ as a minimum Charpy toughness requirement and recommended that material used under "structural notches, restraint, low temperatures, or shock loading" be Charpy-tested. This led to the widespread adoption of the Charpy test in codes and standards, eventually including ISO 14556, Charpy V-Notch Pendulum Impact Test, Instrumented Test Method.

== Apparatus and procedure ==
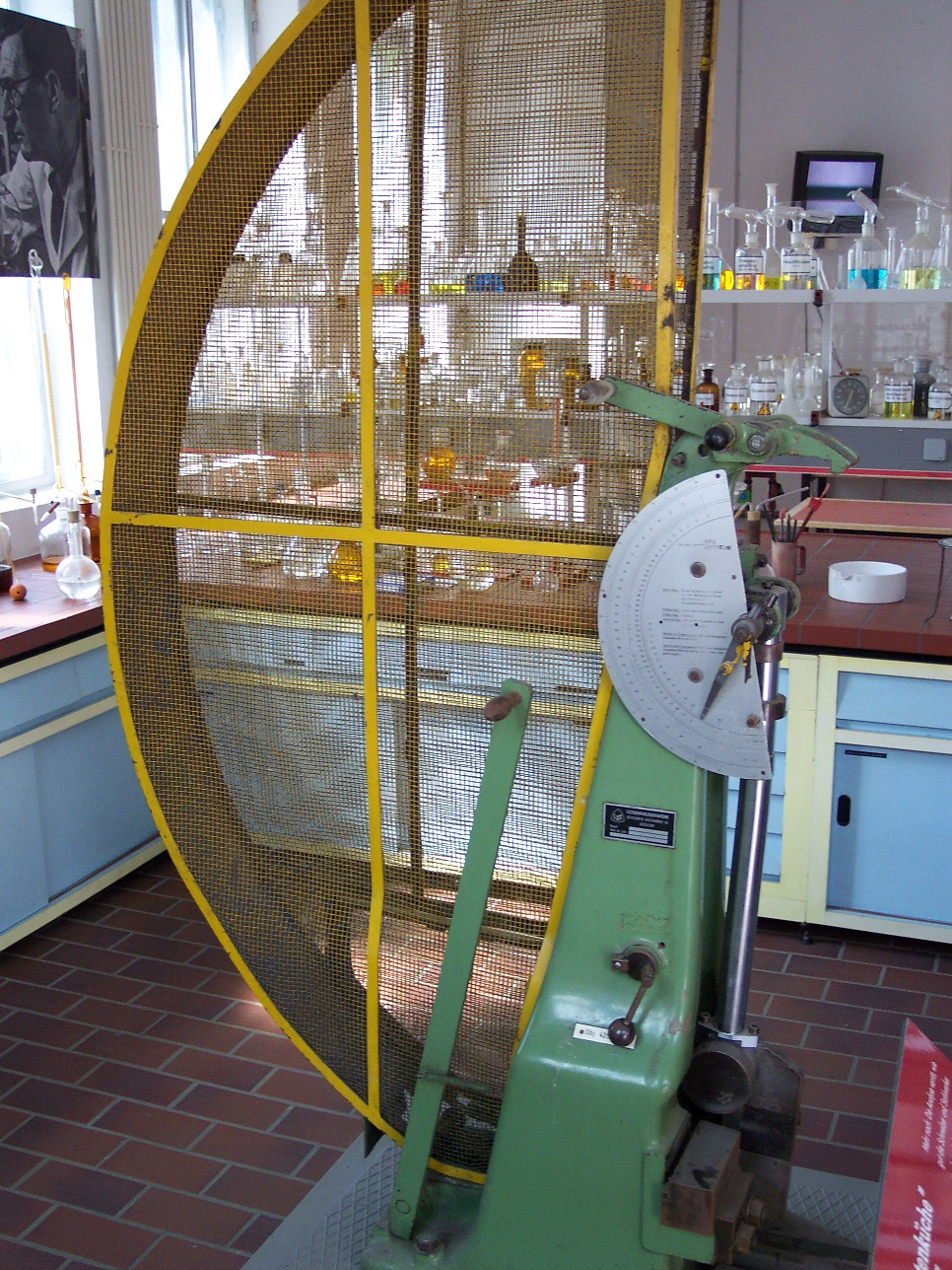
A vintage impact test machine. The yellow cage on the left prevents accidents during the pendulum swing. The pendulum is shown at rest at the bottom.

Schematic of the pendulum, showing the heights $h$ and $h'$ used to compute the absorbed energy.

The apparatus consists of a pendulum of known mass and length, dropped from a known height to strike a notched specimen of material. The energy transferred to the material is inferred from the difference in height of the hammer before and after the fracture, which equals the energy absorbed by the fracture event. Neglecting friction, the absorbed energy is

$$K = mg(h - h'),$$

where $m$ is the mass of the pendulum, $g$ the standard acceleration of gravity (9.80665 m/s^{2}), $h$ the release height of the pendulum, and $h'$ the height it reaches after fracturing the specimen. The machine's scale is normally graduated directly in joules. The bench may be equipped with a rotary encoder that measures the release and arrival angles, from which the heights are computed.

The pendulum's nominal initial potential energy $K_p$ is not fixed by ISO 148-1. It is treated as a property of the installed machine, verified per ISO 148-2 and reported with the result. The standard imposes only one constraint linking $K_p$ to the test, namely that the absorbed energy $K$ shall not exceed 80% of $K_p$, with any result above that threshold reported as approximate. The pendulum is therefore sized to the material so that the absorbed energy falls in a range where the measurement is valid. The 300 J machine size traces back to the 1906 Brussels Conference of the International Association for Testing Materials, which accepted two standard pendulum types: a $200~\mathrm{kg \cdot m} \approx 2000~\mathrm{J}$ machine and a $30~\mathrm{kg \cdot m} \approx 300~\mathrm{J}$ machine. The now-retired European standard EN 10045-1:1990, §6.2, fixed the standard test conditions at "a nominal machine energy of 300 ± 10 J and the use of a test piece of standard dimensions", with smaller machines (150 J, 100 J) permitted under indexed symbols. Smaller pendulums are used for low-toughness specimens to obtain adequate scale resolution.

Position of the specimen at the moment of impact. The notch is on the face opposite the striker.

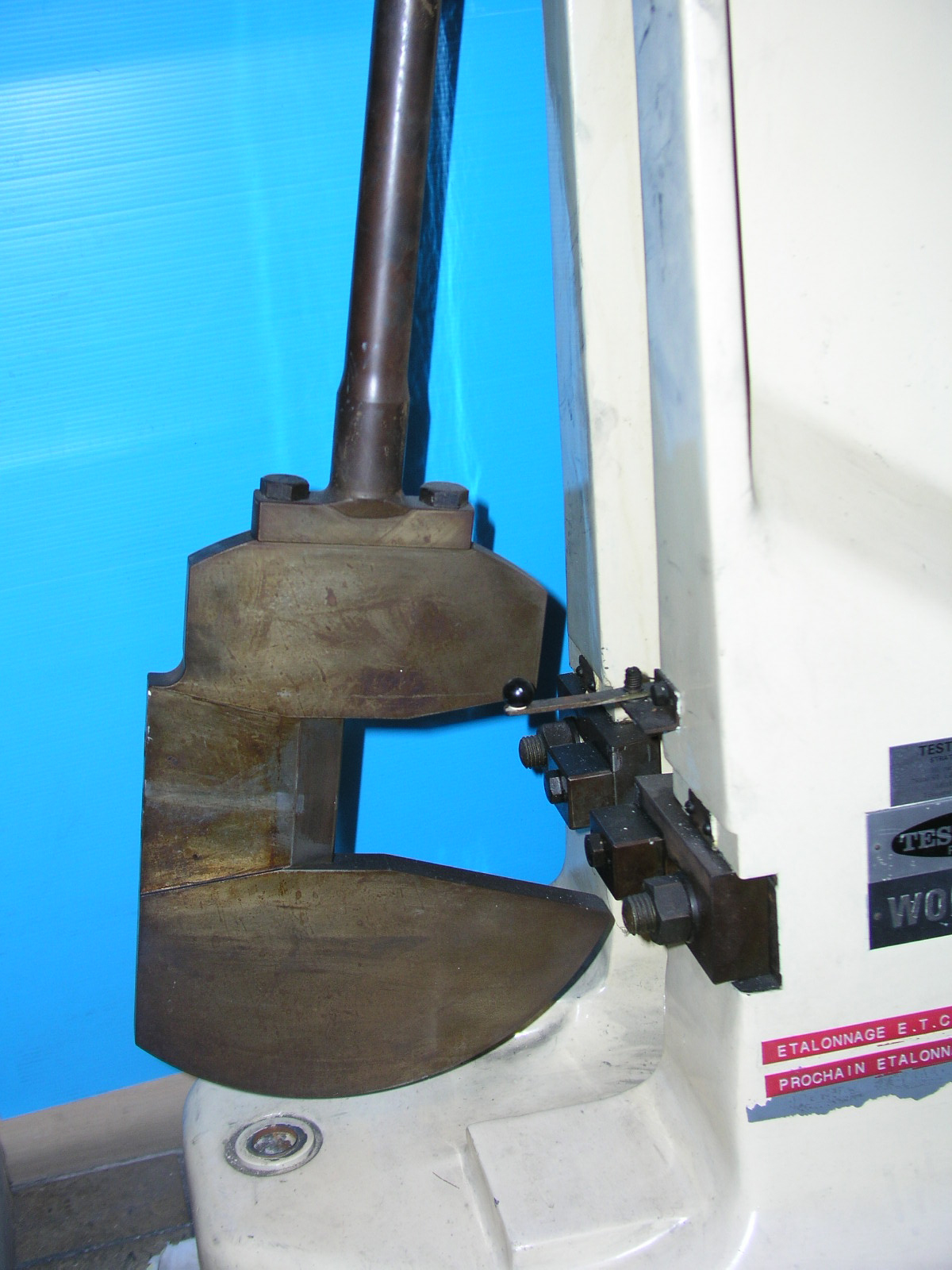
Close-up of the striker and specimen holder of a Charpy pendulum.

The specimen rests horizontally on two supports, with the notch on the face opposite the striker, so that the striker bends the bar into a tensile state at the notch root. The notch dimensions strongly affect the result, so the notch must have regular dimensions and geometry. The specimen size also affects the result: the cross section determines whether the material is in plane strain, which can greatly affect the conclusions drawn.

Video of a Charpy pendulum in operation.

The Standard Methods for Notched Bar Impact Testing of Metallic Materials are given in ASTM E23, ISO 148-1, or EN 10045-1 (retired and replaced by ISO 148-1), where all aspects of the test and equipment are described in detail.

== Testing configurations ==
Sketch of the Charpy configuration: the specimen rests on two supports and the striker hits the center, opposite the notch.

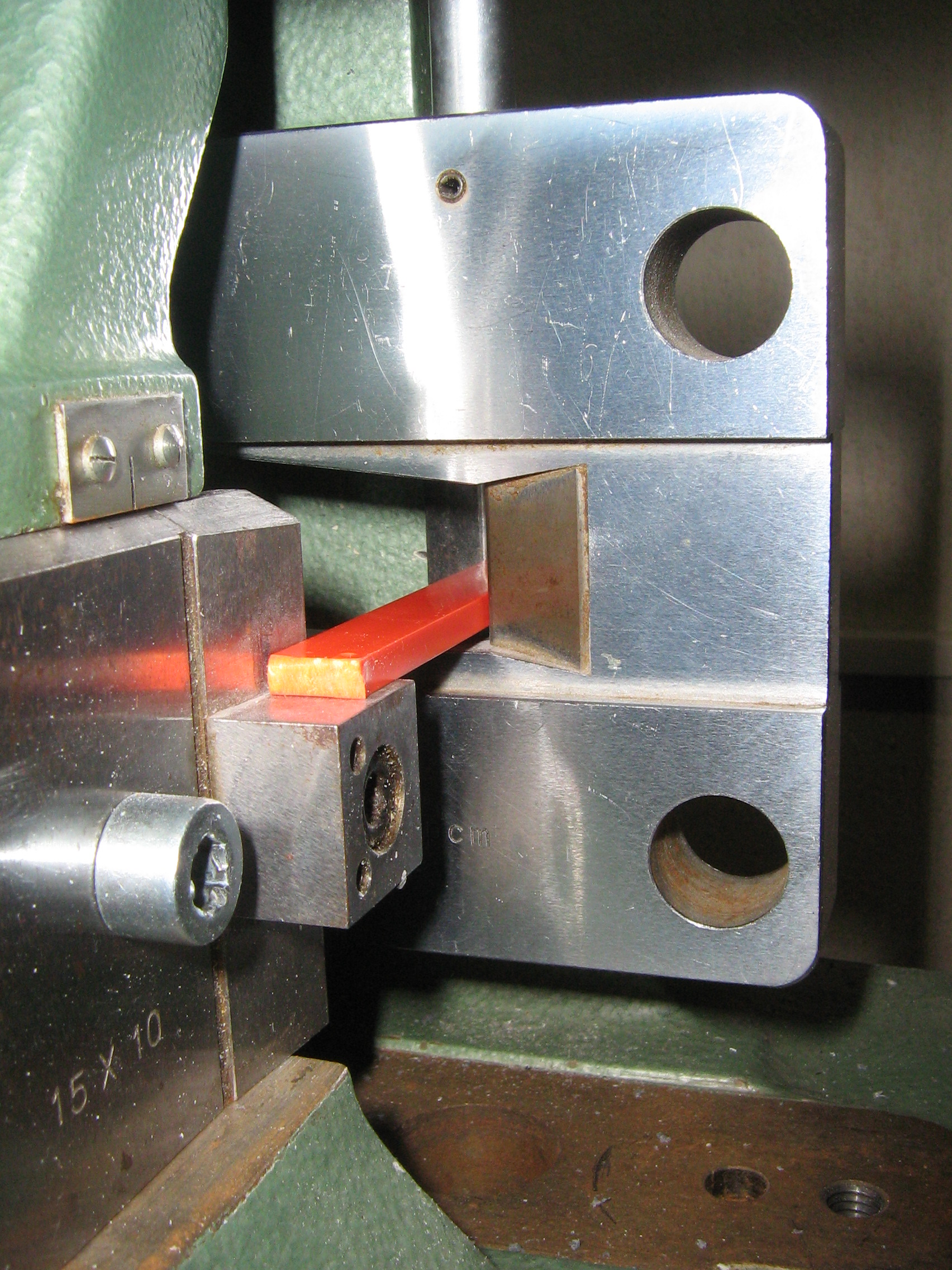
specimen arrangement for the Charpy test on plastic specimens to ISO 179.

Two broad arrangements of notched-bar pendulum impact testing are distinguished, the Charpy and the Izod configurations:

- In the Charpy arrangement, the specimen is supported at both ends, and the pendulum strikes the center on the face opposite the notch. This is the geometry used in the Charpy test for metals (ISO 148-1) and for plastics (ISO 179-1, ISO 179-2 for the instrumented variant). The Schlagbiegeversuch (bending-impact test) with hole or double-V notches under DIN 53753 also belongs to this group.
- In the Izod arrangement, the specimen is clamped at one end like a cantilever, and the pendulum strikes the free end above the notch. This is the geometry used in ISO 180 (Izod) and DIN 53435 (Dynstat). Because Dynstat requires only very small specimens about 10 by 15 millimetres (0.39 in × 0.59 in), it is well suited to component-level testing where larger specimens cannot be machined.

== Qualitative results ==
The impact test may fracture the specimen completely into two or more pieces, or only deform it. Two limiting cases are distinguished:

- Ductile: jagged surface with lateral contraction and shear lips at the edges. The specimen may remain in one piece, shaped like a "V".
- Brittle: flat surface with smooth, undeformed edges. Cleavage facets may be visible. The specimen snaps cleanly into 2 pieces.

Most materials, under certain conditions, do not always fall in one mode. By repeatedly measuring specimens of the same material under the same conditions, one obtains the percentages of ductile and brittle fracture.

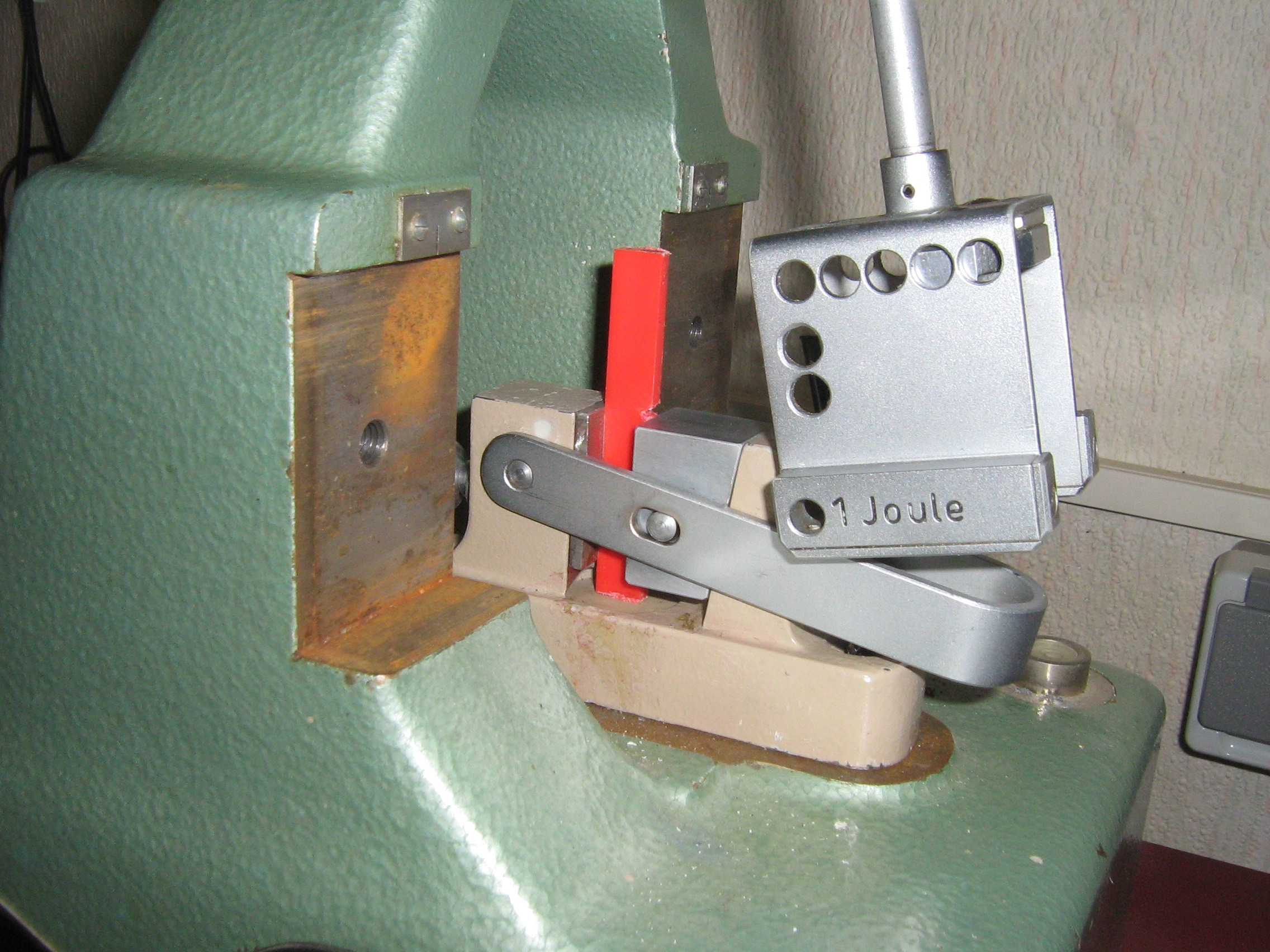
specimen arrangement for the Izod test to ISO 180. The specimen is clamped at one end and struck above the notch.

== Quantitative results ==
The test quantitatively measures the energy absorbed by the specimen, usually called the Charpy (impact) energy.

The ductile-brittle transition temperature (DBTT) may be derived from the temperature at which the Charpy energy changes drastically. In practice there is no sharp transition and it is difficult to obtain a precise transition temperature: it is really a transition region. Usually, the Charpy energy decreases as temperature decreases.

An exact DBTT can be derived empirically in several ways, for example, the temperature at which Charpy energy reaches the midpoint between the high-temperature maximum and the low-temperature minimum. It may also be defined qualitatively, as the point at which 50% of the area being cleavage. However, these two definitions may differ .

The relationship between Charpy energy and the testing conditions is connected to the yield strength, the strain rate, and other mechanical properties of the material.

The Charpy energy and the elongation and reduction of area from the tensile test do not enter directly into a strength calculation. They support only a qualitative judgment, or a classification, of the material's energy-absorption capacity.

== Specimen geometry ==
Standard 10 mm × 10 mm × 55 mm V-notch Charpy specimen.

According to ASTM A370, the standard specimen size for Charpy impact testing is 10 mm × 10 mm × 55 mm. Subsize specimens are 10 mm × 7.5 mm × 55 mm, 10 mm × 6.7 mm × 55 mm, 10 mm × 5 mm × 55 mm, 10 mm × 3.3 mm × 55 mm and 10 mm × 2.5 mm × 55 mm.

According to EN 10045-1 (retired and replaced by ISO 148), the standard specimen size is 10 mm × 10 mm × 55 mm. Subsize specimens are 10 mm × 7.5 mm × 55 mm and 10 mm × 5 mm × 55 mm.

According to ISO 148, the standard specimen size is 10 mm × 10 mm × 55 mm. Subsize specimens are 10 mm × 7.5 mm × 55 mm, 10 mm × 5 mm × 55 mm and 10 mm × 2.5 mm × 55 mm.

According to MPIF Standard 40, the standard unnotched specimen is 10 mm (±0.125 mm) × 10 mm (±0.125 mm) × 55 mm (±2.5 mm).

=== Notch geometry ===
Charpy specimens are notched by machining at their mid-length. The most common notch is the V-notch (type A in ASTM terminology), 2 millimetres (0.079 in) deep. A U-notch (type C), 5 millimetres (0.20 in) deep, is also used. A keyhole notch was introduced into ASTM E23 in 1941 as "type B" and was listed by EN 10045-1:1990 as an alternative with the same nominal dimensions as the U-notch. It is a milled slot with a circular hole drilled at its base to define the root radius. Their geometries are summarized below.

Standard notch geometries for Charpy specimens
Dimension (mm)	V-notch	U-notch
Length	55	55
Height	10	10
Width	10	10
Height at notch root	8	5
Root radius	0.25	1
Notch angle	45°	parallel sides

== Theory ==
Charpy energy varies with material in two largely independent ways: with crystal structure and with yield strength.

Classical theory states that body-centered cubic (BCC) metals (ferritic and martensitic steels, ferrite, molybdenum, tungsten, vanadium, chromium) show ductile-brittle transition, but face-centered cubic (FCC) metals (austenitic stainless steels, copper, aluminum, nickel) do not. There are exceptions. BCC without transition: 18% nickel maraging steel C-300, beta brass, potassium, highly pure molybdenum, highly pure iron. FCC with transition: standard purity iridium.

In the Davidenkov-Wittman classical theory of the transition, the DBTT is the temperature where the yield-stress curve $\sigma_y(T)$ crosses the cleavage-stress curve $\sigma_c$. Above the DBTT, $\sigma_y$ is reached first and the material yields before cleaving (ductile). Below the DBTT, $\sigma_c$ is reached first and the material cleaves before yielding (brittle). Strengthening operations raise $\sigma_y(T)$ at every temperature without changing $\sigma_c$, so the crossover moves to higher temperature: this is the mechanism behind the DBTT shift with strengthening composition.

BCC metals show a sigmoidal Charpy energy versus temperature curve. The upper shelf is high, with fracture by ductile microvoid coalescence. The lower shelf is low, with fracture by cleavage on {100} planes. Slips on intersecting {110} planes nucleates microcracks on cleavage planes. The Charpy test combines three brittleness-promoting conditions in a single measurement: low temperature, high strain rate (about $10^2$ to $10^3$ per second versus $10^{-3}$ per second for a quasi-static tensile test), and the triaxial tensile stress state at the V-notch root. A smooth tensile test at the same low temperature may show the material as ductile, but the same material may still fail brittly in service if all three conditions hold.

In BCC metal, increasing yield strength reduces the upper-shelf Charpy energy (or the whole curve in FCC metals without a DBTT). The lower shelf, where fracture is cleavage rather than ductile, is essentially unchanged, because the cleavage energy is set by the {100} facial energy. This relationship is called the strength-toughness trade-off. Operations that increase yield strength (solid-solute carbon or manganese, precipitation hardening, grain refinement, martensitic transformation, etc) generally work by changing the material in a way that resists dislocation motion. But this also shrinks the plastic zone at the crack tip during fracture, so the work performed on the crack tip plastic zone is smaller. This means yield strength and Charpy energy respond to the same microstructural cause in opposite directions. The combined effect generally increases DBTT. In BCC steel, for example, adding 0.1% carbon to mild steel raises the 15 ft·lbf V-notch DBTT by about 25 °F. With decreasing yield strength, the Charpy curves look like the side-view silhouette of a cobra rising up to strike.

A notch creates a triaxial tensile stress state at its root, which raises the effective DBTT relative to a smooth tensile specimen of the same steel. Yielding is driven by deviatoric stress. Cleavage is driven by the maximum principal stress. Triaxial tension increases the maximum principal stress while suppressing the deviatoric stress, so the cleavage criterion is reached before the yield criterion. A BCC steel that passes a smooth tensile test at a given temperature can therefore still fail by brittle fracture when notched, welded, or constrained.

Impact tests on low-density natural materials such as wood do not measure toughness directly, for several reasons. ISO 17281 recommends that the pendulum-to-specimen mass ratio to be near 40:1, but low-density materials likely exceed that. This makes the impact short-duration, excites higher modes of vibration in both the specimen and the pendulum arm, and causes multiple tup-specimen contacts ("chattering") during fracture. Less of the energy loss occurs by absorption by the specimen, and more of the loss occurs through friction, support deformation, machine-mass acceleration, and vibration of machine parts. The absorbed energy is a mixture of work done to deform and fracture the sample, friction, deformation of supports, deformation of support, deformation of striker, and vibration of machine parts.

== Standards ==
Metallic materials

- ASTM E23, Standard Test Methods for Notched Bar Impact Testing of Metallic Materials
- ISO 148-1, Metallic materials - Charpy pendulum impact test - Part 1: Test method
- ISO 148-2, Metallic materials - Charpy pendulum impact test - Part 2: Verification of testing machines
- ISO 148-3, Metallic materials - Charpy pendulum impact test - Part 3: Preparation and characterization of Charpy V-notch test pieces for indirect verification of pendulum impact machines
- ISO 14556, Metallic materials - Charpy V-notch pendulum impact test - Instrumented test method
- EN 10045-1 / -2 (retired, replaced by ISO 148-1 / -2)

Polymers

- ISO 179-1, Plastics - Determination of Charpy impact properties - Part 1: Non-instrumented impact test
- ISO 179-2, Plastics - Determination of Charpy impact properties - Part 2: Instrumented impact test

== See also ==
- Izod impact strength test
- Brittle fracture
- Impact force
