= Epigenetics in forensic science =

Overview article

Epigenetics in forensic science is the application of epigenetics to solving crimes.

Forensic science has been using DNA as evidence since 1984, however this does not give information about any changes in the individual since birth and will not be useful in distinguishing identical siblings. The focus of epigenetics in the forensic field is on non-heritable changes such as aging and diseases.

Epigenetics involves any changes to the DNA that does not affect the sequence, but instead affects the activity of the DNA, such as the level of transcription of a particular gene. These changes can be passed down transgenerationally through the germline or arise after birth from environmental factors. In humans and other mammals, CpG dinucleotides are the main sequence that develops methylation, and because of this most studies on try and find unique methylation sites. There are a few methylation sites that have been determined as a cause of environmental influences from age, lifestyle, or certain diseases.

== DNA methylation ==
DNA methylation is a common epigenetic mark being studied as potential evidence in forensic science. Unlike DNA, realistic DNA methylation is less likely be planted at crime scenes.> Current methods to fabricate DNA usually exclude important methylation marks found in biological tissues making this a way to confirm the identity of an individual when evidence is being assessed.

Many different tissues can be used to analyze methylation.

== Sample preservation ==
The effect of cryopreservation on epigenetic marks in tissues is a new area of study. The primary focus of this research is on oocytes and sperm for the purpose of assisted reproductive technology, however it can be useful in forensics for the preservation of evidence. Methylation can be analyzed in fresh tissue that is cryo-preserved within 24 hours of death and it can then be analyzed in this tissue for up to 1 year. If the tissue is formalin-fixed or putrefied, methylation analysis is much more difficult.

== Aging ==
Although blood is the primary sample used in studies, most tissues consistently show that methylation increases early in life and slowly decreases, globally, throughout late adulthood. This process is referred to as epigenetic drift.

The epigenetic clock refers to methylation sites that are highly associated with aging. These sites consistently change across individuals and can therefore be used as age markers for an individual. There are some models that have been developed to predict ages for specific samples, such as saliva and buccal epithelial cells, blood, or semen, but others have been made to age any tissue. In 2011, three significant, hypermethylated CpG sites related to aging across all samples were found in the KCNQ1DN, NPTX2, and GRIA2 genes. The age guess for over 700 samples had a mean absolute deviation from chronological age (MAD) of 11.4 years. Two years later, almost 8,000 samples were used in an elastic net regularized regression to create a new age predictive model. This resulted in 353 CpG sites being chosen for the age prediction, and the model had a MAD of 3.6 years.

There is evidence for specific methylation sites to be associated with the circadian clock, meaning a sample could have a time of day associated with their death through methylation marks. In whole blood from humans, plasma homocysteine and global DNA methylation change in levels throughout the day. Homocysteine levels peak in the evening and are at their lowest overnight while DNA methylation follows an inverse pattern. Other studies with rats found that expression of DNMT3B and other methylation enzymes oscillate with the circadian clock and may be regulated by the circadian clock. Another methylation associated factor, MECP2, is phosphorylated by the superchiasmatic nucleus in response to light signaling. In a group of subjects that died from a variety of causes, there was partial methylation at the PER2, PER3, CRY1, and TIM promoters which are important genes in controlling the circadian clock. The methylation of CRY1 varied within an individual's tissues and between two individuals, however the difference between individuals may have been due to methamphetamine exposure.

=== Teeth ===
An age model using dentin from teeth is currently being studied. Over 300 genes have been found that are a part of odontogenesis and quite a few affect the epigenome. For example, JMJD3 is a histone demethylase that modifies the methylation of homeobox and bone morphogenetic proteins. More studies are being done to differentiate genetic, epigenetic, and environmental factors on methylation in teeth so that aging algorithms are more accurate.

Previously, measuring differences in between sets of teeth was done with calipers, but 2D and 3D imaging has become more available and allows for better accuracy of measurements. New programs are being developed to analyze these images of teeth. Mono-zygotic twin studies reveal 8-29% of changes between the twins' teeth is from the environment. Several studies of mono-zygotic twins have shown that when they have a tooth defect, such as congenitally missing or supernumerary teeth, the twins can share the same number or position of the defective tooth, but sometimes not both of these factors.

=== Twin identification ===
Monozygotic twins provide information on epigenetic differences that are not from genetic factors. Epigenetic markers differ the most in monozygotic twins who spend time apart or have a very different medical history. As twins age, their methylation and acetylation of histone H3 and H4 increasingly vary. These marks are specific to the environmental changes between the twins and not changes in methylation from general aging. The rate of disease discordance between monozygotic twins is usually over 50%, including heritable diseases. This does not correlate to the disease prevalence rate.

There are more phenotypic methylation differences in twins discordant for bipolar, schizophrenia, or systemic lupus erythematosus than in unrelated cases. There is no difference between twins discordant for rheumatoid arthritis or dermatomyositis. A limitation to the current studies on twin disease discordance is the lack of a baseline epigenetic profile of the twins before they develop the disease. This baseline will be used to distinguish the environmental changes between the twins to narrow down the methylation sites related to the disease. Several studies are obtaining newborn epigenetic profiles for long-term research.
