= Wildlife forensic science =

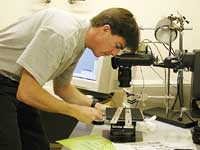
A United States Fish and Wildlife Officer works in the forensics laboratory.

Wildlife forensic science is a forensic science applied to legal issues involving wildlife and biological resources.

Wildlife forensic sciences deal with conservation and identification of rare species and used as a tool for non-invasive studies, and can be used to determine the relatedness of rare and endangered species that are candidates for genetic rescue. Techniques using Single-Strand Conformational Polymorphism gel electrophoresis (SSCP), microscopy, DNA barcoding, Mitochondrial Microsatellite Analysis, and some DNA and Isotope analysis can identify species and individual animals that have been captured.

== History ==
Wildlife forensic science stems from the various issues relating to wildlife crime. Wildlife crime includes actions such as wildlife trafficking, poaching, wildlife cruelty, and habitat destruction, causing issues with ecological stability, economies, public health, and criminal justice. Out of international crime, wildlife crime is the third largest illegal trade behind drugs and firearms, and potentially makes $20 billion dollars per year. The application of wildlife forensic science is used as supporting evidence to pass legislative acts that help prevent wildlife crime,such as the Endangered Species Act and the Lacey Act.

=== Endangered Species Act ===
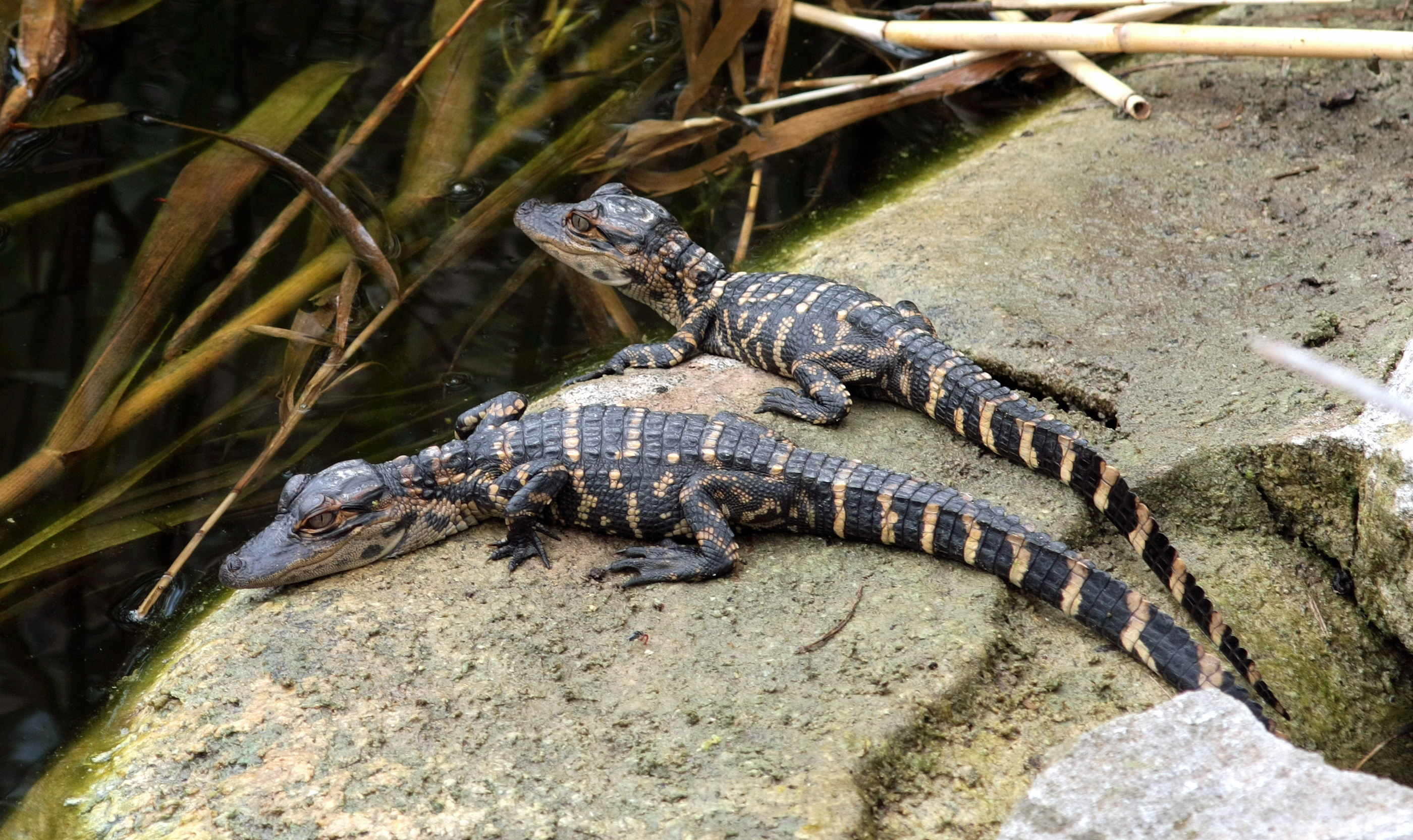
The American Alligator is one of the animals protected under The Endangered Species Act.

The Endangered Species Act (ESA) was developed in the United States, and was signed by President Richard M. Nixon on December 28, 1973. The overarching goal of the ESA was to conserve and protect wildlife and their habitats across the globe. This act aimed to prevent extinction and encourage recovery of organisms, and included protection for various ecosystems, and encouraged the creation of various treaties with countries around the world in order to protect species. This included migratory bird treaties with Canada, Mexico, and Japan and the creation of a convention for Natural Protection and Wildlife Preservation.

=== Lacey Act ===
The Lacey Act was developed in the United States, and was signed by President William McKinley on May 25, 1990. The act initially started with preventing hunters from killing game illegally and transporting them across states. The Lacey act has since had various amendments, including in 2008 and 2009, which expanded the acts reaches. These new updates included expanding to protect timber and timber products. Today, the Lacey act focuses on the illegal trafficking of wildlife and plants. Importing, exporting, transporting, selling, and purchasing species are now sections that are included in the modern Lacey Act.

=== Migratory Bird Treaty Act ===
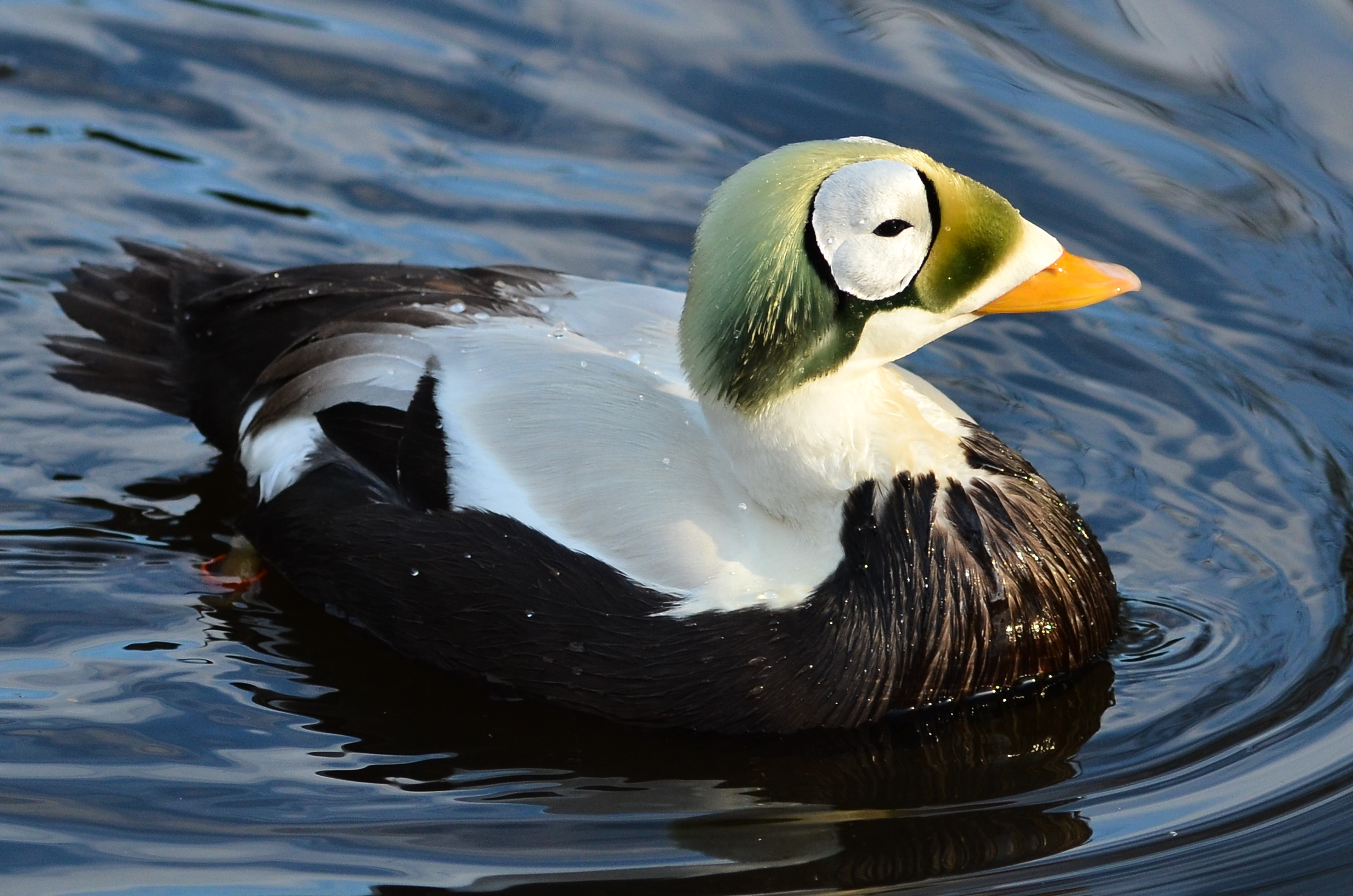
The spectacled eider is a bird that is protected under the Migratory Bird Treaty Act, and is on the endangered species list.

The Migratory Bird Treaty Act (MBTA) was enacted in 1918, and worked to implement treaties from Canada (1916), Mexico (1936), Japan (1972), and Russia (1976) to protect migratory bird populations. A migratory bird species is protected if it meets any one of the following three criteria.

1. It occurs in the United States naturally, or is listed as one of the birds on the international treaties with Canada, Mexico, Japan, and Russia.
2. If it results from a taxonomy split from a species that was previously on the list and fits the criteria for number 1.
3. If there is new evidence that it used to occur naturally in the United States.

=== Marine Mammal Protection Act ===
The Marine Mammal Protection Act (MMPA) protects mammals that use the ocean as a means of survival, including whales, manatees, and dolphins, walruses, and polar bears. The MMPA protects against any form of harassment, collection, hunting, capturing, or killing of marine mammals in U.S waters or by U.S citizens.

== Threats ==
=== Wildlife trafficking ===
Wildlife trafficking is the illegal trading of live animals or animal parts. Wildlife trade generates a large amount of revenue each year, and can total billions of dollars. Various animals are trafficked for the exotic pet trade, such as birds, reptiles, and corals. Animal parts that are commonly traded include bushmeat, animal horns for medicinal and ornamental purposes, and materials to make fashion products. A prime example of a trafficked animal are pangolins, which are often trafficked for their scales. Wildlife forensic scientists use DNA to determine information about the trafficked species.

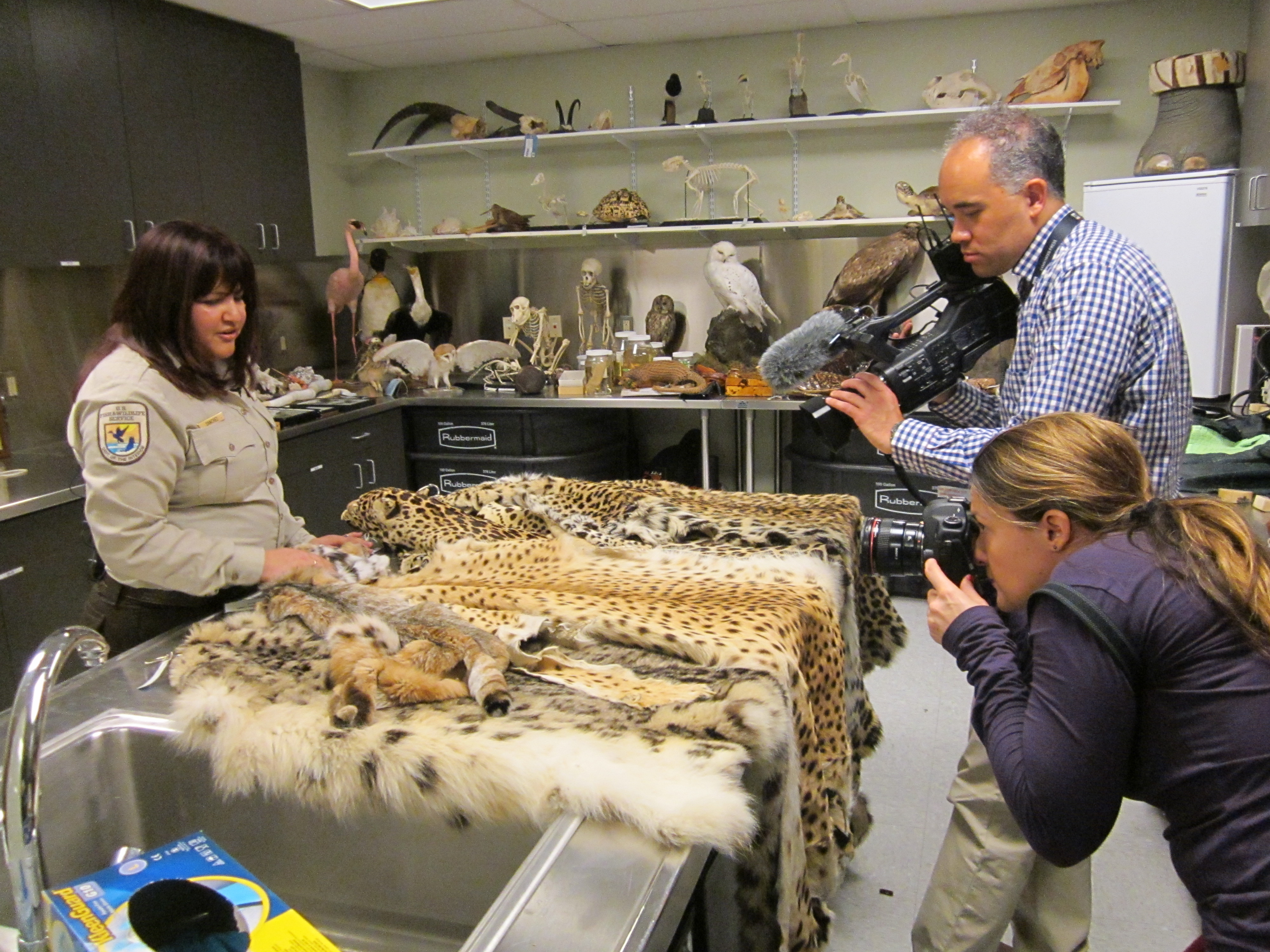
Various illegal pelts, likely from wildlife trafficking or poaching are shown to Washington Post reporters and photographers at a Wildlife Evidence Lab for the United States Fish and Game Services.

=== Poaching ===
Poaching is the illegal hunting or capture of wild animals. Thousands of species are affected by poaching, including pangolins, african elephants, and all five species of rhinoceros. Products from poaching can include ivory, animal skins, bones, and bushmeat. These items are sold as they are or turned into leathers, traditional medicines, and ornaments.

=== Animal cruelty ===
Animal cruelty is the harm, injury, or killing of an animal. Wildlife forensic scientists explore the aftermath of events where animals have been killed due to cruelty and abuse. Wildlife forensics can assist in determining what species of animals may have been in a location, as well as determining what may have happened to wildlife if they have been killed by cruelty.

=== Habitat destruction ===
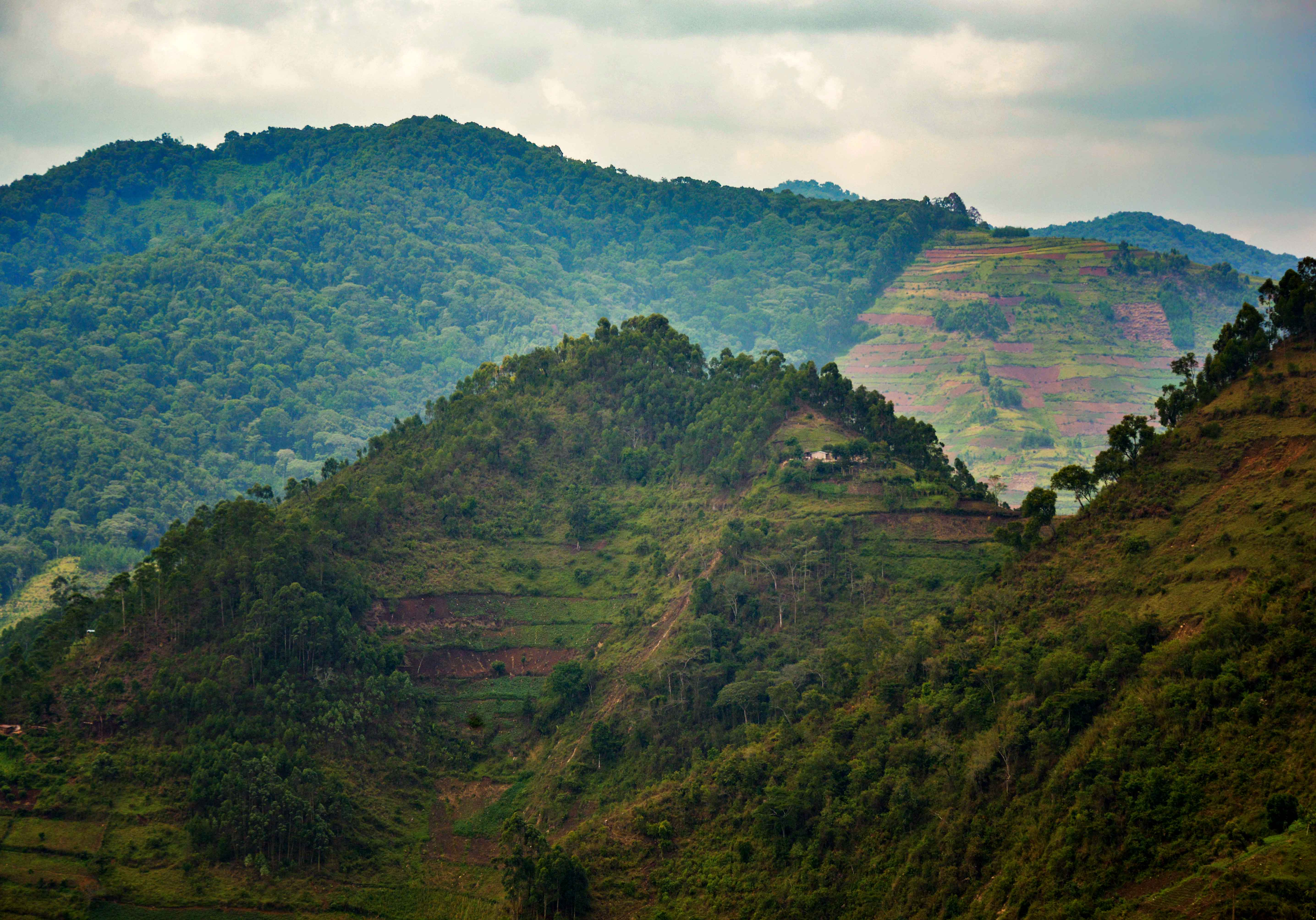
A Ugandan mountainside is stripped of trees, causing the destruction and fragmentation of various habitats.

Habitat destruction is the degradation of a habitat to the point where it can no longer support native wildlife. In order to help combat habitat destruction, genetic sequencing and classification of morphological structure play key roles in protecting an area. Wildlife forensic sciences have been used to sequence animals such as pangolins, and plants such as orchids, in order to identify the species living in areas that are being destroyed, and to help provide evidence and the support for protection of areas. Naming species is a key issue in being able to conserve an area, and wildlife forensics can assist in this via genetic analysis.

== NWCU (National Wildlife Crime Unit) ==
As demonstrated by the threats above, a unit of the police has evolved (Mainly UK based). It was founded in 2006. They work on decreasing human threats to wildlife such as working to prevent / decrease badger hunting and baiting along with many other issues that they are in the progress of addressing. The main role of the UK NWCU is to assist in the prevention of wildlife crime

Their Wiki page : National Wildlife Crime Unit

Their official online website : https://www.nwcu.police.uk/

== Techniques ==
=== Single-Strand Conformational Polymorphism Gel electrophoresis ===
A simple and sensitive technique used to identify any mutations and also used in the genotyping of animals. The technique uses the method based on the fact that single-stranded DNA has a defined conformation. Any altered conformation due to a single base change in the sequence can cause single-stranded DNA to migrate differently under nondenaturing electrophoresis conditions, so a wild-type and mutant DNA samples display different band patterns.

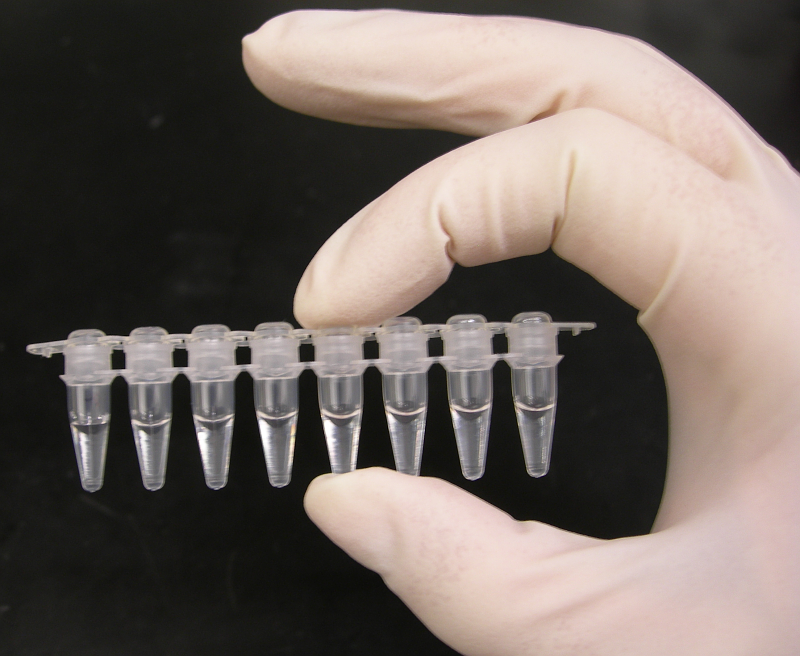
A strand of tubes commonly used in PCR reactions.

There are 4 steps to this method:

1. polymerase chain reaction (PCR) amplification of DNA sequence of interest
2. denaturation of double-stranded PCR products
3. cooling of the denatured DNA (single-stranded) to maximize self-annealing
4. detection of mobility difference of the single-stranded DNAs by electrophoresis under non-denaturing conditions.

=== DNA and isotope analysis ===
DNA analysis is used to help determine the species of an animal they use DNA nucleotide sequencing as a key method and follow it up by comparing sequenced DNA fragments with reference DNA sequences of different species. The similarity or sequence homology between the unknown and reference sequences facilitates to ascertain the species of origin. This technique is used to determine relatedness of a rare species and to also check for any signs of inbreeding depression in the target species to see if it is a candidate for genetic rescue. Isotope analysis is used in this same vein to determine the composition of the habitat that animal resides in.

=== Mitochondrial microsatellite analysis ===
Mitochondrial microsatellite analysis methods are often performed to individualize the remains of an animal and determine if a species is endangered, or if it was hunted out of season. Mitochondrial DNA reference profiles can be easily be obtained from public databases like the International Nucleotide Sequence Database (INSDC), the European Molecular Biology Laboratory (EMBL), and the Bardode of Life Data System (BOLD or BOLDSystems). Mitochondrial DNA is used due to its high copy number, and the presence of differences in mutation rates among closely related species. The cytochrome c oxidase unit 1 (CO1) region (also known as the DNA barcode region) mutates at a lower rate and is used for higher level taxonomic classifications whereas the control region and cytochrome b are used in distinguishing closer related taxa due to their mutation rate being higher.

=== DNA barcoding ===
DNA barcoding is often used in Wildlife Forensic Science cases to identify an unknown species found at a crime scene. Blood, hair, bone, and other genetic materials are first collected at the scene, then DNA extraction is performed on the samples collected. After that, DNA quantification or PCR is performed to quantify the DNA, then DNA sequencing is performed to sequence the DNA. Lastly, the sequenced DNA is compared to a DNA database for a possible identification of the unknown species. This technique is often used in poaching cases, animal abuse cases, and killing of endangered animals.

=== Microscopy ===
This technique is when genetic microscopes are used to look down to a single cell it is used to look at recombination also look for mutations in genes it has been used to help identify many deleterious alleles in genes.

=== Ballistics ===
The science of wound ballistics is beginning to gain attention for wildlife forensics as a method to determine what type of firearm may have killed an animal. This focuses on specifically wound ballistics, and what the wound damage is on the body of the organism. These can be traced back to specific types of bullets and firearms, and may be useful in tracing crime back to certain parties or organizations.

=== Fingerprinting ===
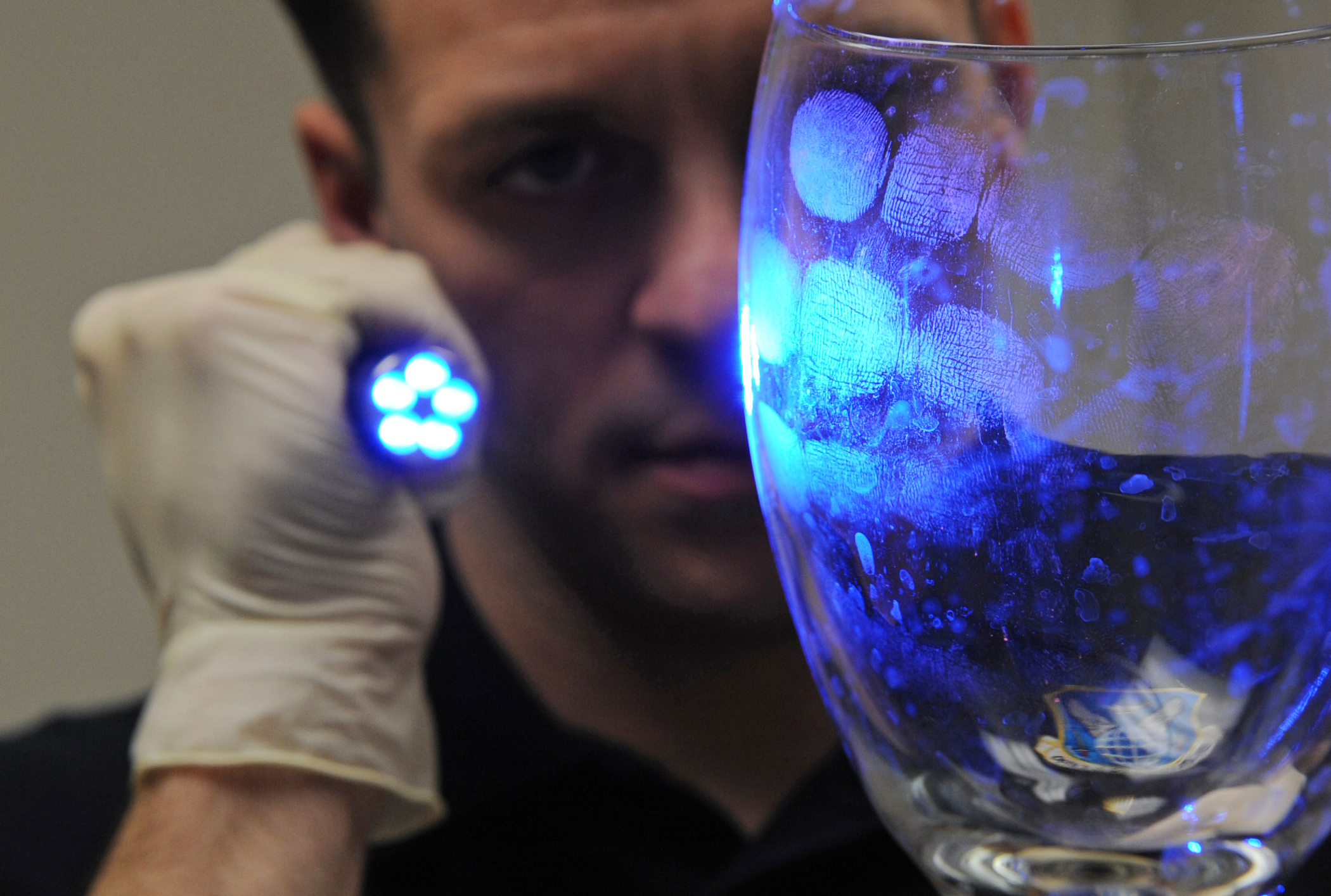
Special Agent Adam Deem shines light on to a glass in order to reveal fingerprint marks.

Fingerprinting is a current technique that is actually particularly common in human crime, and overtime has begun to migrate to the wildlife forensics world. Fingerprinting can pick up a variety of marks, and beyond just fingerprints can pick up impressions of most body parts. These fingermarks can be found on most surfaces, and can either be patent or latent fingerprints. Patent fingerprints can be collected by photography, as patent fingerprints are visible to the naked eye. For latent prints, there are various methods to collect them, including powders, fuming, chemical, optical, and instrumental methods. In wildlife forensic science, fingerprinting has been used to lift latent marks off of pangolin scales, and additionally studies have recovered fingermarks on raptor feathers using magnetic and fluorescent powders. New successes and studies are also being found pulling fingerprints off of eggshells, ivory, teeth, bone, leathers, and antlers.

=== Forensic entomology ===
Forensic entomology is the use of insects to demine information about criminal cases. Forensic Entomology is commonly accepted in legal cases and is particularly helpful in determining time of death for both human and wildlife crimes. One of the key insects in these studies are blow flies, which deposit eggs on bodies, and the time off hatching for the eggs can be important for determining time of death. An example of forensic entomology occurred in Manitoba, Canada where two young black bears were found disemboweled. Officers collected blow fly eggs from the deceased cubs, and data was used to determine time of death. This data was used in the conviction and proved itself valuable in a wildlife crime context.

=== Forensic pathology ===
Forensic pathology developed out of the veterinary profession, and begin as a way to study disease in domestic animals, and eventually migrated to wildlife. In a forensic sense wildlife pathology has been used to look into the cause and the circumstances of deaths of threatened species. This forensic pathology helps provide baseline data and basic samples such as blood of feces. Forensic Pathology also includes full biopsies which can help analyze tissue and organ changes that may have led to the death of an animal. One of the most common examinations for Forensic Pathology are necropsies, but there are also pre-mortem examinations occur as well.

=== Forensic parasitology ===
Forensic parasitology centres on the utilisation of parasites as evidence in forensic investigations. Within wildlife forensics, this can take three main forms: 1) as indicators of movement or transport, 2) as indicators of neglect, 3) as indicators of poaching from wild populations. Many parasites have highly specific or limited distributions and therefore can provide insights into where an animal may have been moved from; as its parasites act as biological tags. The occurrence of parasites outside their natural range may be indicative of the anthropogenic movement of animals. Parasites may also act as indicators of neglect in trafficked wildlife, especially in cases where wounds become infested (e.g., myiasis). Many parasites undergo complex life cycles, sometimes involving many different host species (e.g., trematodes). These complex life cycles rarely take place in captivity and as such, the presence of parasites is often indicative of poaching from wild populations. Additionally, veterinary practices (e.g., anti-parasitic drugs) often remove parasites from captive animals and under diligent veterinary care parasites rarely persist in captive animals. Therefore, the presence of parasites on wildlife species in captivity can be an indicator of poaching from wild populations, especially among wildlife in the pet trade.

== Laboratories and organizations ==
Various laboratories and organizations have formed in order to develop and perform wildlife forensic sciences. The Society for Wildlife Forensic Science and Scientific Working Group for Wildlife Forensic Sciences were both formed in 2011. In addition, the Wildlife Forensic and Conservation Genetics Cell was formed by merging a Wildlife Forensic and Conservation Genetics Labs. The Wildlife Forensic and Conservation Genetics Cell was formed in order to support the enforcement and creation of the Wildlife Protection Act. In addition to various laboratories, there are several organizations that also aid in the wildlife forensic science. The World Wildlife Fund helps provide education about wildlife crime and wildlife forensic sciences. CITES, TRAFFIC, and the IUCN also support wildlife forensic science, and use the data from it to support the conservation of wildlife. Finally, Interpol, an organization that handles international crime focuses specific support to wildlife forensic science and its use in solving wildlife crimes.

== Scope ==
While animals and plants are the victims in the crimes of illegal wildlife trade and animal abuse, society is also affected when those crimes are used to fund illegal drugs, weapons and terrorism. Links between human trafficking, public corruption and illegal fishing have also been reported. The continued development and integration of wildlife forensic science as a field will be critical for successful management of the many significant social and conservation issues related to the illegal wildlife trade and wildlife law enforcement.

== See also ==
- Marine forensics
