= SSCP =

SSCP may refer to:

- Systems Security Certified Practitioner, an IT Security certification offered by (ISC)²
- Single strand conformation polymorphism in molecular biology
- Sum of squares and cross products matrix, another name for the normal matrix or Gram matrix in the matrix formulation of ordinary least squares
- Sethusamudram shipping canal project
- Summary of safety and clinical performance for medical devices
