= Chartered Society of Forensic Sciences =

UK-based professional society

The Chartered Society of Forensic Sciences (CSFS), formerly the Forensic Science Society, is an international professional society based in the United Kingdom. It was founded in 1959 and is one of the oldest and largest forensic associations in the world. The main aim of the society is to encourage communication and collaboration by providing an arena in which forensic practitioners, researchers, academics and those working in related fields can congregate, communicate and invoke development of areas such as best practice, research, publication, quality and ethics in forensic casework.

In 2004 the Forensic Science Society became a professional body, and the voice for forensic practitioners, both in the UK and abroad. As of receiving a Royal Charter in October 2013, sealed on 17 of January 2014, the Forensic Science Society was renamed the Chartered Society of Forensic Sciences.

The CSFS aims to provide opportunities for practitioners, academics and interested parties to congregate, communicate and collaborate and is committed to providing opportunities for professional development.

The CSFS promotes scholarship and education through its journal, one of the oldest journals in the field, Science & Justice as well as its Educational Quality Standards scheme for HE forensic science courses and CPD.
