= Science & Justice =

- Discipline: Forensics
- Language: English
- Edited by: K Farrugia

Publication details
- Former name: Journal of the Forensic Science Society
- History: 1960–present
- Publisher: Elsevier
- Frequency: Quarterly
- Impact factor: 2.0 (2024)

Standard abbreviations
- ISO 4: Sci. Justice

Indexing
- CODEN: SJUSFE
- ISSN: 1355-0306
- OCLC no.: 180164310
- Journal of the Forensic Science Society
- ISSN: 0015-7368

Links
- Journal homepage; Online access

Science & Justice is a peer-reviewed scientific journal of forensics published by Elsevier on behalf of The Chartered Society of Forensic Sciences. The journal was established in 1960 as the Journal of the Forensic Science Society and obtained its current name in 1995.

One notable article was an analysis of the assassination of John F. Kennedy, which disputed the conclusion of the 1982 United States National Academy of Sciences report that the House Select Committee on Assassinations finding of a fourth shot in acoustical evidence was incorrect. A later article re-analyzed the acoustic synchronization evidence, rebutting this argument as well as correcting errors in the 1982 report, while supporting its finding that the sounds alleged to be gunshots occurred about a minute after the assassination. Follow-up Science & Justice articles have been published, too.
