= Marine forensics =

Marine Forensic Science is forensic science applied to legal issues involving marine life. It also refers to the scientific study and investigation of human incidents, accidents, or deaths occurring as a result of or involving bodies of water including oceans, streams or rivers, lakes, or ponds. Marine forensics uses law enforcement to protect fisheries resources, marine mammals, and endangered species. Pollution from rapid industrialization and other human activities caused declination in fisheries resources and coral reefs have threatened marine life. On October 21, 1972, the Marine Mammal Protection Act of 1972 (MMPA) was enacted, was enacted, protecting fisheries resources, marine mammals, and endangered species. DNA analysis plays a vital role in marine forensics, considering the flesh and blood of marine species in investigations, as well as recovery techniques for investigations that include human remains. However, a marine environment poses many challenges to the taphonomy of dead remains and to the investigation itself affecting the accuracy of results. Many intrinsic and extrinsic factors have to be examined as the marine environment is constantly changing which can affect results. Thus, a marine scientist is essential to be observant and cautious at all times during investigations.

== History ==
Marine forensics dates from the 1970s when Congress passed the series of acts that protected fisheries, marine mammals, and endangered species, called the Marine Mammal Protection Act.

The Marine Mammal Protection Act of 1972

At first, the act aimed to prevent the population of whales, seals, and porpoises from dropping exponentially by the disturbance of human activities. It focuses on preventing the number one cause of death among marine mammals which is the accidental capture in commercial fishing and subsequent fishing line entanglement. After 1994, the act “prohibits acts or attempts of harassment, killing, and capturing marine mammals without prior approval with a permit.”

However, these are the certain exceptions to the act:

1. Pre-MMPA specimens taken before December 21, 1972
2. International Agreements entered into by the United States before December 21, 1972
3. Alaska natives
4. Scientific research, public display, enhancing the survival or recovery of a species, and incidental take in commercial fisheries
5. Waivers granted by the U.S. Government

The first International Marine Forensics Symposium was held in April 2002 at Washington, DC

== Threats ==
Threats towards marine forensics involves radioactive and chemical pollution from rapid industrialization, fisheries and coral reefs in decline, and global warming and carbon balanced that can no longer be kept since the water is very polluted compared from back then making the water unable to absorb as much carbon-dioxide as before and increase risks of global warming to occur

Waterborne diseases are a current threat towards marine forensics that are caused from an outbreak of various microorganisms and chemicals which can lead to illness and death for marine life and humans. The Waterborne Disease and Outbreak Reporting System (WBDOSS) was created in 1971, and is a national surveillance system that collects data on waterborne diseases from all types of water. WBDOSS can report on chemicals in the water from pollution as well as pathogens like bacteria, parasites, and viruses that cause gastrointestinal disease and respiratory disease.

== Training ==
Due to the complications in the process, a marine forensics scientist is required to have certain sets of skills such as the way to ask appropriate questions, how to work with uncooperative witnesses, and the understanding the specific goals of the company's incident investigation program. Investigators also need background on how incidents evolve and the myriad events and attributes which can cause or contribute to the severity of an incident

== Types of Evidence ==
Types of evidence varies depending on the severity of the case. With marine life cases, evidence can range from frozen fish fillets, scales, tissue, and bones, to coral reef or water samples In 2012, researchers at the Virginia Institute of Marine Science shows that tests can be taken on seafood to identify the ocean's origin of blue marlin. In forensic investigations involving incidents and deaths, evidence can range from the body itself, items and clothing, to environmental data such as water and soil samples, water and air temperatures, Salinity, depth readings, and current speeds. The faster an investigator gets to a scene and documents the surroundings, the more physical evidence will be preserved due to the environment being uncontrolled and constantly changing.

== Data Acquisition ==
DNA analysis is an essential tool in forensics science. As mentioned above, evidence will vary depending on the scenario. The process involves collecting and testing evidences in laboratories, along with analyzing evidences such as blood samples, dried tissue, fish fillets, and fish scales. In forensic investigations, due to the nature of the environment, numerous data is collected right at arrival. The temperature outside and inside the water, the depth of the water, how fast the water is flowing, and the salinity of water is recorded to help estimate Corpse decomposition changes and where the body could be located.

Marine Forensics utilizes diving, drones, and thermal imaging to help acquire data for the investigation. Unmanned aerial vehicles or drones have become a popular technology used for a variety of tasks in law enforcement as they are able to cover large amounts of terrain that are hard to access in short periods of time minimizing the need for a ground search. UAV's provide overhead surveillance which may reveal hidden terrain or debris where certain items could be hiding not visible to the human eye. Advancements in technology have been making it easier to locate remains in a marine environment through the use of thermal imaging, which creates pictures using heat/Infrared radiation by displaying various colors on a screen. Drones are being manufactured with thermal imaging to pair with the convenient overhead searching in order to detect any heat signature from the decomposition of a hidden body. Underwater search techniques have been developed for divers to use when searching for remains in a body of water. These patterns are the sweep pattern, pier-walk pattern, snag search, grid search, and overhead search which all allow the diver to search for any sized objects that may be in the water.

== Controversies ==
Maritime taphonomy impacts the accuracy in results in forensics. Also, 80% and more maritime incidents are caused by human error. Many of these maritime incidents or deaths may have nothing to do with water, only coincidentally happen to be near water. In these scenarios, it will be crucial for the investigation to determine the true manner and cause of death through investigative techniques and an Autopsy. This is most common with natural diseases and injuries leading to a submersion in water like a Heart attack, Seizure, beatings, even intoxication.

== Environmental Factors ==
=== Temperatures ===
It is important to monitor the temperature of the air outside the water as well as inside the water as it will help in understanding decomposition of the remains. Normally, the temperature will be cooler in the water than the ambient air temperature which slows down the decomposition process, not including tropical bodies of water but due to the environment being uncontrolled and temperatures always changing, they must be recorded as soon as possible at arrival of the scene for accurate interpretation of the incident.

=== Salinity ===
Salinity refers to the amount of salt content in a body of water and cannot be overlooked in marine forensics as freshwater and saltwater have many differences in taphonomy and decomposition. In saltwater, decomposition will proceed at a slower rate than in fresh water due to the high sodium content drawing fluids out of organs and slowing bacterial activity, whereas in freshwater, fluids are absorbed quicker into organs and the bloodstream causing rupturing. It is important to know about salinity as it is responsible for buoyancy and why objects and remains float in water. Knowing the salinity level of the body of water in question will aid in where evidence might be located such as at the bottom of water or floating near the surface.

=== Currents ===
Currents in water are a crucial factor to consider during marine investigations as they can answer many questions. If currents are involved in the body of water, it can drag/drift the evidence in question for a large distance to a location that does not match the wounds on the body adding confusion to the investigation. From drifting for a long distance, the remains/evidence can bump into artifacts like rocks or trees causing post-mortem injuries and abrasions which can confuse investigators understanding the true cause of death. Due to the buoyancy in saltwater like oceans, most remains float and will catch a tidal current causing it to drift for hundreds of kilometers, making it near impossible to find the remains, showing why marine investigators need to work as fast as possible at recovering evidence. In freshwater, currents won't move the evidence too far from where it first was, but they risk getting post-mortem injuries from waterfalls, rapids, and narrow banks (geography). Furthermore, when pollution from industrialization contaminates the water, tidal currents and river currents are able to spread it quite quickly with speeds from 5–100 miles per day, proving again why investigators need to be vigilant and work quickly at recovering evidence.

=== Animal Predation ===
Animal predation is a factor to consider when launching an investigation in a marine environment. The longer an investigation is drawn out, the more potential there is for animals and sea life to create extensive changes to the evidence in question before it can be removed. Sea lice and Sharks are examples that can alter features of a body and create more confusion in the investigation as to the nature of certain wounds. Due to the nature of food webs, contaminants and pollution in water may spread rapidly from species to species if the problem is not solved quickly.

== Related Laboratories and Organizations ==
NOAA logo

=== National Oceanic and Atmospheric Administration(NOAA) ===
The NOAA is the only laboratory in the United States for marine forensics

=== Northwest Fisheries Science Center (NWFSC) ===
Northwest Fisheries Science Center is a part the National Oceanic and Atmospheric Administration(NOAA) informally known as NOAA Fisheries. NWFSC also help NOAA Fisheries Office of Law Enforcement protect consumer interests. The agency also help to ensure that high consumer interest would not result in the rising of illegal activities such as food fraud.

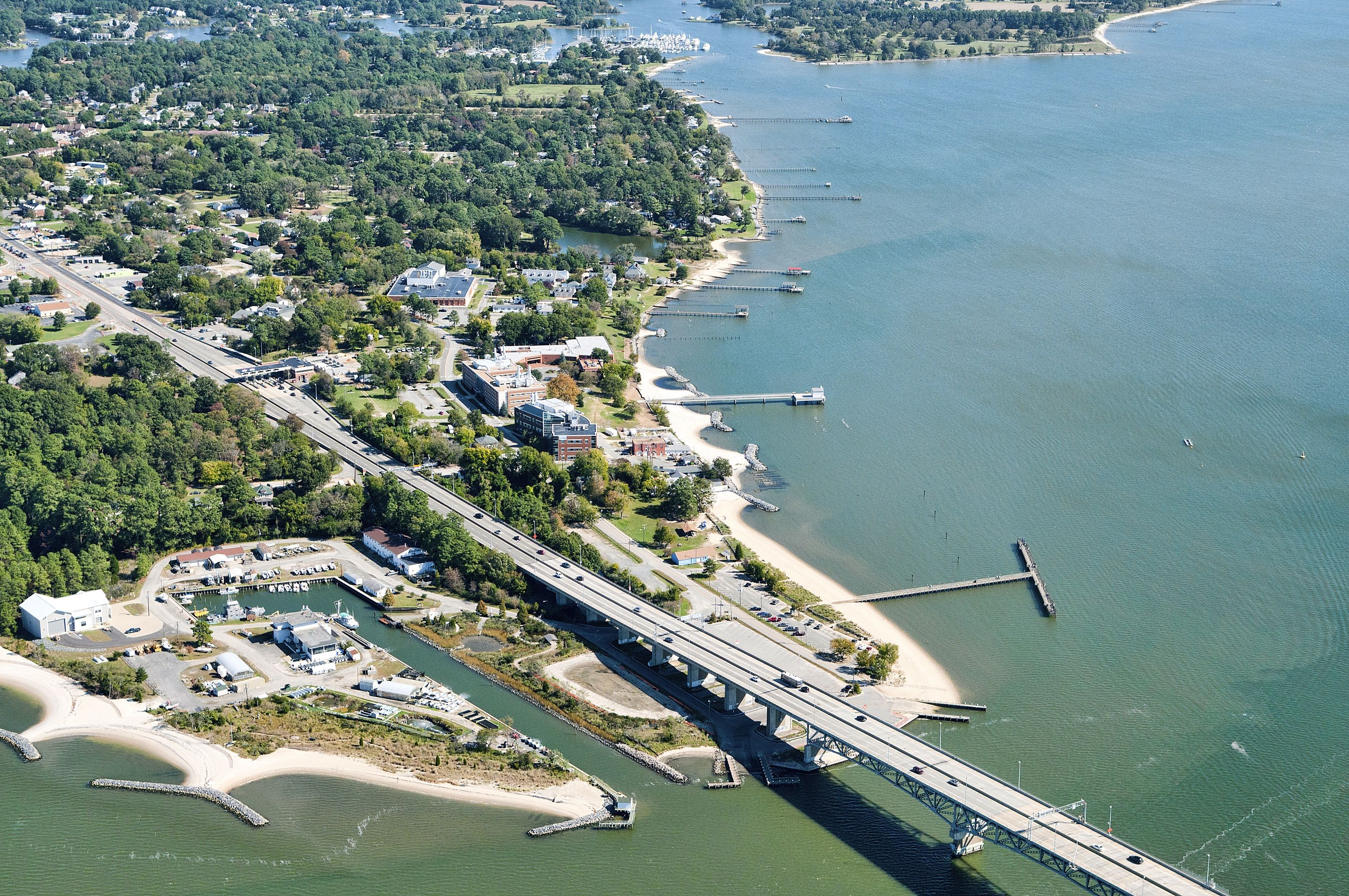
VIMS campus in Gloucester Point, Virginia

=== Virginia Institute of Marine Science (VIMS) ===
“VIMS provides research, education, and advisory service in marine science to Virginia, the nation, and the world.” The research team members of VIMS includes Laurie Sorenson(graduate student), Jan McDowell(molecular biologist), and John Graves(professor).

=== Marine Accident Investigation Branch (MAIB) ===
Marine Accident Investigation Branch is an independent division of the United Kingdom's Department for Transport, Local Government and the Regions(DTLR).

=== Office of the National Coordinator for Health Information Technology (ONC) ===
“ONC is the principal federal entity charged with coordination of nationwide efforts to implement and use the most advanced health information technology and the electronic exchange of health information. “

== See also ==
- Wildlife forensics
