= Joseph Thomas Walker =

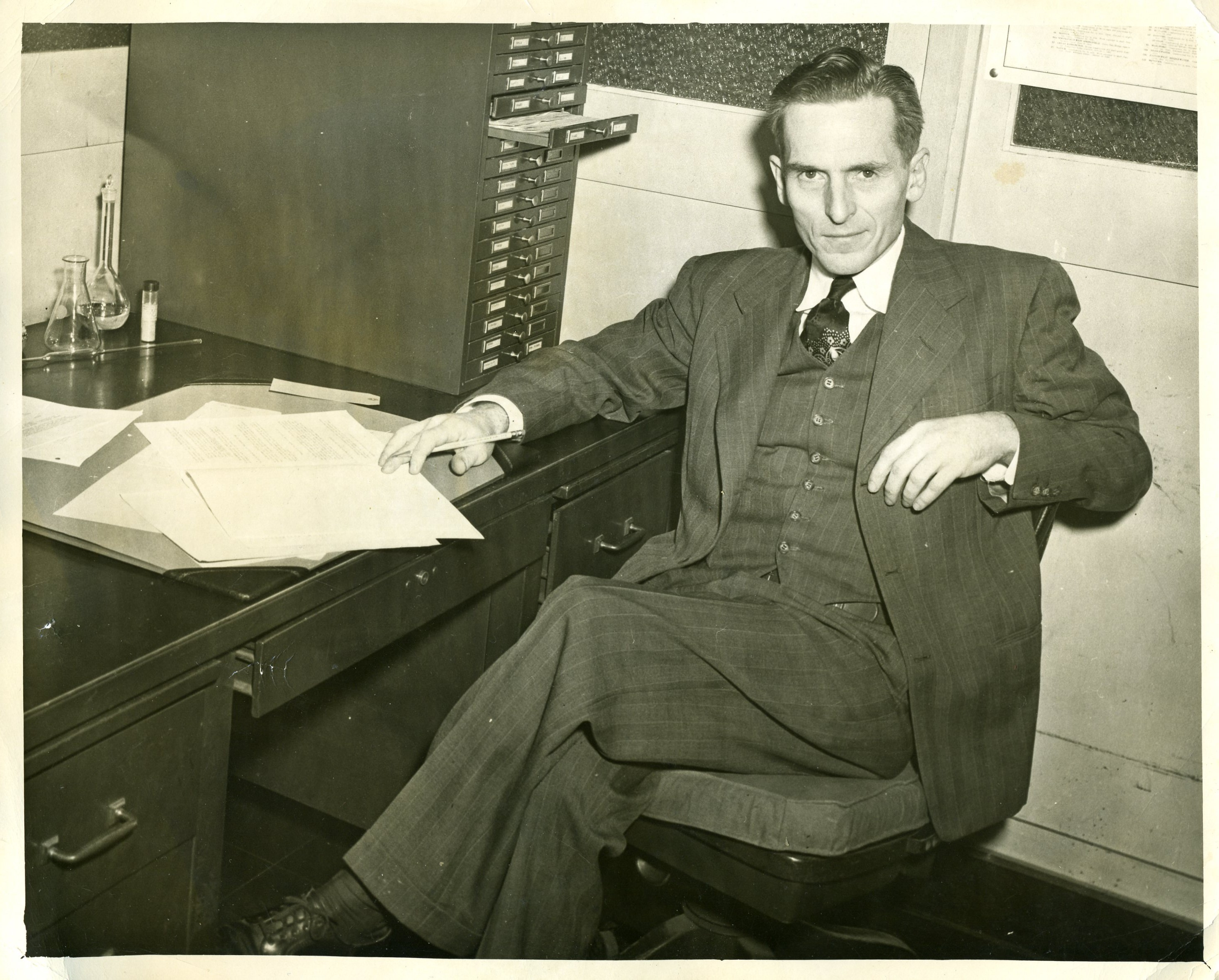
- Walker in the late 1940s
- Born: January 26, 1908; Saint Louis, Missouri
- Died: April 29, 1952 (aged 44)
- Education: BA in chemistry (University of Illinois); Doctorate in chemistry (Harvard University)
- Known for: Contributions to forensic science
- Scientific career
- Fields: Forensic science
- Institutions: Massachusetts State Police Chemical Laboratory; Chemical Laboratories of the Department of Public Safety

Joseph Thomas Walker (January 26, 1908 – April 29, 1952) was a pioneer in forensic science. He earned a doctorate in chemistry from Harvard University in 1933. In 1934, he created the Massachusetts State Police Chemical Laboratory, the first statewide crime detection lab in the country, and later, the Chemical Laboratories of the Department of Public Safety, which he ran until his death. During that time, Walker developed many of the scientific techniques utilized in modern crime detection. His eulogy in the Journal of Criminal Law and Criminology states "Throughout the world his methods are used, his name is known, and all men benefit." Lawyer-turned-mystery-writer Erle Stanley Gardner dedicated the foreword to one of his books to Walker and commented, upon hearing of his death, that Walker was "the greatest real life detective he had known."

== Early life and education ==
Born in Saint Louis, Missouri, Walker attended Kirkwood High School before earning a BA in chemistry from the University of Illinois in 1930. That year, he also took a few graduate courses. Soon, as the Great Depression worsened, he went back to school. In 1932, he enrolled in a doctoral program in chemistry at Harvard University and graduated in less than a year. Meanwhile, during his undergraduate years at Illinois, he had met and fallen in love with fellow Illini, Lola Jeanette Muns. Since the DuPont Fellowship which supported him at Harvard forbade recipients from marrying during their studies, the two were hastily wed in 1932. Their marriage – which produced two children (Janet in 1935 and Thomas in 1940) – lasted until his death in 1952.

== Career ==
When Walker began his career in 1934, scientific crime detection was still new. Though Charles Norris and Alexander Gettler had been doing forensic science for New York City for over a decade, they were halted by the city governments. Walker, on the other hand, the first person to create a state crime lab, would work in a supportive environment. Originally housed in a small room in the Massachusetts State House, his lab was quickly moved to spacious accommodations and equipment and supplies were forthcoming as needed. In addition, he earned rapport with the Massachusetts State Police and other authority to secure crime scenes – a relatively new concept – by taking basic police training in 1936. Walker also gained an academic platform when crime detection enthusiast/philanthropist Frances Glessner Lee gave Harvard a large endowment to fund a Department of Legal Medicine where, from 1939 onward, he taught toxicology. Ms. Lee proselytized the virtues of the type of work he was doing by holding multi-day seminars on the subject around the country. Just before his death, she would tell Walker that "No other lecturer has helped individuals and the whole training program as you have."

Walker still pursues his work. On one occasion, he had a cofferdam built in a river downstream from a bridge from which a bagful of human bones had been dropped; later, a bullet with striations linking it to the suspect’s weapon was found. And there was the internationally publicized "Case of the Merry Widow" in 1936 concerning the murder and dismemberment of socialite Grayce Asquith, which involved an identification of basic blood type and the first ever use of a toe print (in blood under a tub) in a criminal trial. In 1945, prominent lawyer John Noxon was convicted of electrocuting an infant son born with Down Syndrome. Though Noxon claimed that the death had been an accident, Walker determined the father’s guilt by revealing that there were microscopic quantities of copper from an electrical cord on both the infant’s body and a metal tray.

Walker wrote journal articles to promote his ideas and techniques. In 1937, he published "Chemistry and Legal Medicine" in the New England Journal of Medicine. In it, he argued that all states should have crime labs and listed ways that chemistry could be used in crime detection. Towards the end of the article, he recommended the use of a new technique he had developed for use in shooting cases. Whereas, previously, powder burns had been detectable only in cases where the person had been shot at close range, his test would reveal the "entire powder pattern from shots fired at a much greater distance … by locating each individual grain of powder in the exact position in which it lies upon the cloth."

He also authored or co-authored a series of journal articles describing his new techniques. Among these, were: "The Spectrograph as an Aid in Criminal Investigation," "The Quantitative Estimation of Barbiturates in Blood by Ultraviolet Spectrometry," "Paper Chromatography in Criminal Investigation," "A New Test for Seminal Stains," "Visualizing of Writing on Charred Paper," "Bullet Holes and Chemical Residues In Shooting Cases," and "Paper Chromatography for Identification of Common Barbiturates"

== Final years ==
Walker would die of Hodgkin’s disease in April 1952 – probably the result of breathing benzene fumes in his own laboratory. Though terribly ill, he kept a full schedule of work for most of his last two years. For instance, in 1950, he travelled to Maine first to teach twenty-five state policemen about the uses of science in crime detection and then to testify at the retrial of a deputy sheriff convicted of murder in 1938. There, Walker was identified in the Maine Attorney General’s official report of the trial as “generally considered to be the outstanding police chemist in New England”, which was the finding that the deputy had been “fraudulently convicted."
