= KCNQ1DN =

Identifiers
- Aliases: KCNQ1DN, BWRT, HSA404617, KCNQ1 downstream neighbor (non-protein coding), KCNQ1 downstream neighbor
- External IDs: OMIM: 610980; GeneCards: KCNQ1DN

Gene location (Human)
Chr.	Chromosome 11 (human)
Band	11p15.4|11p15.5	Start	2,870,033 bp
Band	11p15.4|11p15.5	End	2,872,105 bp
RNA expression pattern
Bgee	Human / Mouse (ortholog); Top expressed in: testicle; C1 segment; substantia nigra; left testis; ganglionic eminence; right testis; hippocampus proper; prefrontal cortex; lymph node; putamen / n/a; More reference expression data
BioGPS	n/a
Gene ontology
Molecular function	molecular function
Cellular component	cellular component
Biological process	biological process
Sources:Amigo / QuickGO
Orthologs
Databases	NCBI: entry; OMA: entry
Species	Human	Mouse
Entrez	55539	n/a
Ensembl	ENSG00000237941; ENSG00000278855	n/a
UniProt	Q9H478	n/a
RefSeq (mRNA)	NM_018722	n/a
RefSeq (protein)	n/a	n/a
Location (UCSC)	Chr 11: 2.87 – 2.87 Mb	n/a
PubMed search		n/a
- Wikidata
View/Edit Human

KCNQ1 downstream neighbour
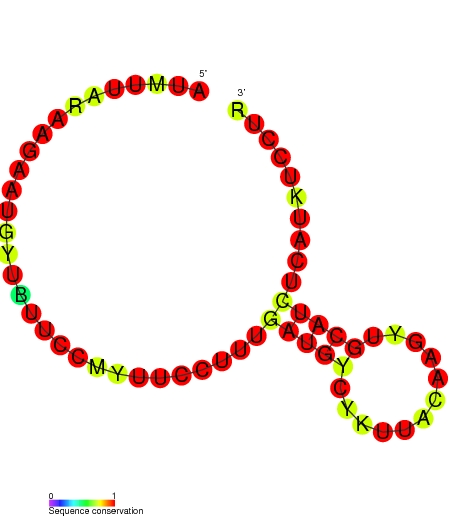
- Predicted secondary structure and sequence conservation of KCNQ1DN

Identifiers
- Symbol: KCNQ1DN
- Rfam: RF01961

Other data
- RNA type: Gene;
- Domain: Eukaryota;
- SO: SO:0001463
- PDB structures: PDBe

KCNQ1 downstream neighbour (KCNQ1DN) is a long non-coding RNA gene. In humans, it is located on chromosome 11p15.5 between the CDKN1C and KCNQ1 genes. It is an imprinted gene, expressed from the maternal allele. Reduced expression of KCNQ1DN is observed in Wilms' tumours.

== See also ==
- Long noncoding RNA
