= Forensic limnology =

Forensic limnology is a sub-field of freshwater ecology, which focuses especially on the presence of diatoms in crime scene samples and victims. Different methods are used to collect this data but all identify the ratios of different diatom species present in samples and compare those samples with the location of a crime scene. Diatom testing is a key method to distinguish between drowning or disposal of a body in water after death.

== Use of diatoms ==
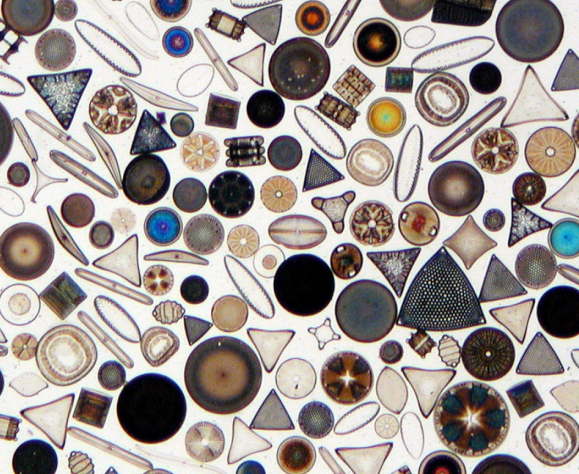
Microscopic view of diatoms

Diatoms are diverse microscopic single-celled algae with silica cell walls, called frustules, that are abundant in freshwater and saltwater ecosystems. There are around 12,000 described species of diatoms that are identifiable based on the unique morphology of their frustules. For many species, there are also known habitat preferences, such as pH or salinity. Which species are present and their relative abundances varies depending on their environment and time of year. Additionally, when diatoms die, the frustules sink and are left behind as part of the water sediment providing a natural time series of diatom assemblages over seasonal and yearly changes. Diatom monitoring programs track the species composition and relative abundances of in an environment, called a diatom profile, of different bodies of water. These profiles can then be used to compare with the species presence and abundances collected from crime scenes or victims.

=== Benefits of diatoms ===
The reason diatoms are a common tool to match water environments is because of the variability of their populations are relatively predictable and constant, they can be identified by using a light microscope, and their silica cell walls allow for preservation and extraction from collected samples. Diatoms can also be collected as evidence from items such as clothing or shoes to inform investigations. If a diatom profile for a water body is not available to compare with collected evidence, different types of diatoms found in a crime scene sample or victim can identify properties of the ecosystem it came from. For example, a higher ratio of periphytic diatoms (i.e., those that are attached to a substrate), the higher the vegetation concentration, and the shallower the water. Diatoms can also be used to distinguish between drowning or disposal of a body in water after death.

=== Disadvantages of diatoms ===
Diatoms do not inhabit treated water sources, which limits the situations that diatoms can be used. Diatom profiles can only explain when or where evidence was found in some situations, and not the time of death if there is no body fluid sample available to be collected. If a body is placed in freshwater post mortem then diatoms cannot be used to evaluate the time of death. Without the inhalation of water and some circulation present in the victim, the diatoms will not be able to enter the alveolar system and bloodstream making it difficult to extract a reliable sample. Another issue with the use of diatoms is because frustules do not break down easily, the presence of diatoms may not only be on a victim or suspect through their relation to a crime scene, which affects the reliability of the results collected from a scene. Different species can also be differentialy preserved, which could affect the results in a criminal investigation. Finally, collecting and analyzing diatoms as evidence is time-consuming and effort intensive.

== Diatom testing ==
Materials taken from victims, suspects, or the crime scene can be tested to match locations of where the samples derived.

In order to use diatom testing, there are some guidelines that scientists must follow. To get a more accurate result, there must be at least 20 diatoms in a 100 microliter sample. When dealing with testing on a human body, having five complete diatoms from more than two different organs will also give a positive diagnosis. Samples are taken from bone marrow, lung, spleen, liver, kidney, brain tissue, or from the area where the crime was discovered or occurred. There are a number of different extraction methods; the most commonly used are "acid digestion" methods, which use a strong acid, such as nitric or sulfuric acid, to dissolve all organic materials, leaving behind the diatom frustules to be analyzed.

When testing for diatoms on an organic sample, scientists use phase contrast microscopy. While observing, the diatoms are tallied and organized based on their different species. The ratio of a specific specimen of diatoms in the water will have a similar ratio to the sample that is taken from the site where the diatoms were transferred. Scientists use this to match materials and people to specific locations at a crime scene. A diatom database (started in 2006) can be used as the "fingerprint system" for diatoms: a computer identifies diatoms to the species based on shape and color characteristics. However, as of 2012, the database was not complete and was not used in courts.

=== Time of death estimation ===
When using diatom testing, scientists observe the amount of diatoms present on the organism and may be able to estimate a generalized time of death. For example, if there are fewer than 20 different species of colonizing diatoms, then the organism's death could have been within the previous 7 to 12 days, but, if there are more than 50 different colonies of diatoms then it is determined that death possibly occurred several weeks ago. Certain diatoms narrow the time frame to more exact dates. For instance, late colonizers, such as Ankistrodesmus algae, may not start to colonize on an organism until 30 days after its death.

== Legal application ==
As of 2012, a small percentage of forensic limnology is used as evidence in courts. The presence of diatoms in air, food, drink, and close contact is not variable enough to be supportive evidence in determining locations of events. Even so, an investigation requires the use of forensic limnology in order to estimate time of death, location of drowning, and the determining of suspect. If the results of forensic limnology are not used in prosecution, the results are used to understand the crime.
