= Hans Gross =

Austrian jurist (1847-1915)

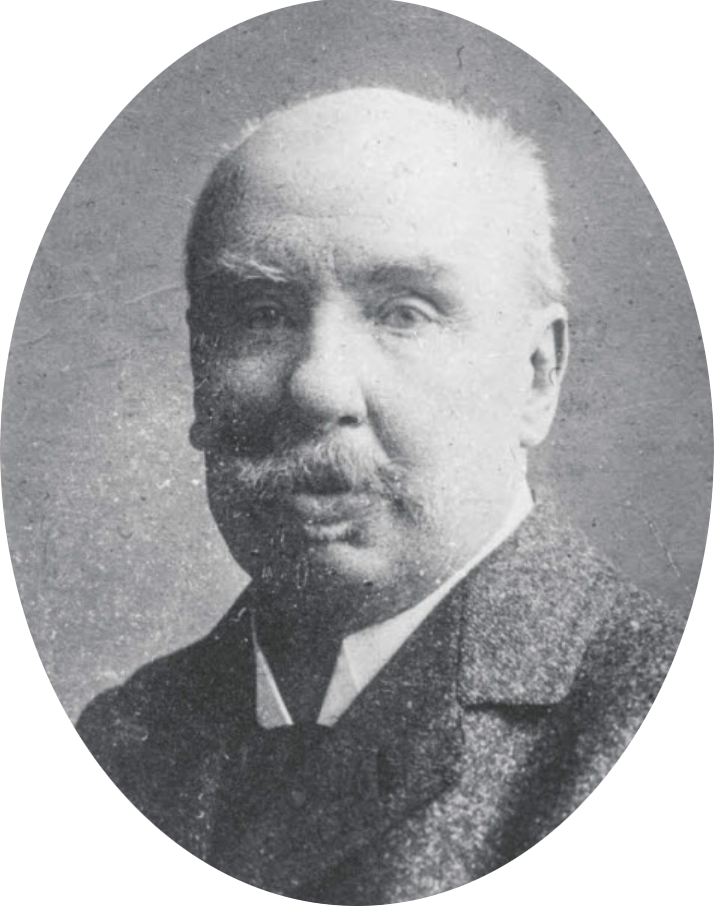
- Gross, c. 1914
- Born: Hans Gustav Adolf Gross; 26 December 1847; Graz, Austrian Empire
- Died: 9 December 1915 (aged 67); Graz, Austrian-Hungarian Empire
- Occupation: Criminal jurist
- Years active: 1870–1915

Hans Gustav Adolf Gross or Groß (26 December 1847 – 9 December 1915) was an Austrian criminal jurist and criminologist, the "Founding Father" of criminal profiling. A criminal jurist, Gross made a mark as the creator of the field of criminality. Throughout his life, Hans Gross made significant contributions to the realm of scientific criminology. As Gross developed in his career as an examining justice, he noticed the failings of the field of law. His book, classes, institutions, and methods helped improve the justice system through his experience as a justice.

== Early life and career ==
Gross was born on December 26, 1847, in Graz, Austria. As a young adult, Hans Gross graduated in 1870 as a jurist from his hometown's university. His education resulted in two decades of learned knowledge in law. Gross served as the Examining Justice of Styria in which he served as a judge and prosecutor for all crimes presented to him. During his service, he dealt with several fraudulent charges. It was during this job that Gross realized the many shortcomings of the present justice system. Back then, the Examining Justice stood as a criminal investigator. During this time, there were very few crime investigators. Many of the law officers were volunteers or ex-police officers. As a result, jurists mainly solved and prosecuted all crimes brought before them. This proved to be a poor system as many of the magistrates relied on their personal knowledge and limited facts or evidence. This lack of organization led to Gross's active work in criminal science.

== Academic impact ==
During his life, Gross did much to establish several institutions regarding criminology. Gross mainly did this by reiterating the practice of criminal forensics. He taught and developed several institutions that furthered the influence of the field of criminology. Throughout the years, Gross taught and engaged in constructive debate while professor at Chernivtsi University (1897 to 1902), Prague University (1902 to 1905), and the University of Graz (1905 to 1915). Later in 1898, he established the Institute of Criminology of Graz. In August 1898, he began to teach criminal law in which he presented the field of criminalities. However, many people opposed this idea developing into a study, claiming that it did not serve true beneficial value except to those involved in the justice system. Despite opposing views, Gross established the field of criminalities, branding him forever as the “Founding Father” of criminal profiling.

== Contributions to criminalistics ==
Gross noticed the faults in the justice system early on in his career. His efforts focused on expanding deep investigation, professional ethics, and the scientific method. He defined criminal psychology from a technical viewpoint, considering it as pure research. Along with studying a person's behaviors, Gross stressed the use of careful judgement due to often misleading evidence. His view of research, technical evidence, and methods also led to the creation of the "crime scene." Relating the concept of the crime scene, Gross explains the necessity of balancing emotion with evidence and evidence with logic. Gross fully introduced the concept of criminalistics in 1893, a period in which the notion of criminology expanded. The concept of criminalistics is divided into two branches: crime and political science. Even though Gross found a new way in which the justice system functioned, many believed the field of criminalistics proved useless, except for examining justices. However, Gross still contributed in furthering criminology for other magistrates in law. He called for the objective use and examination of evidence. He stressed the importance of a judge remaining neutral in cases. He did this, mainly, by presenting new concepts in the examination of crime scenes, such as crime scene photography, fingerprints, microscopy, and X-rays.

== Criminal Investigations, a Practical Textbook ==
Gross's book was written to cover philosophical and systematic aspects of criminology. In 1893, his book Criminal Investigations, a Practical Textbook (Handbuch für Untersuchungsrichter als System der Kriminalistik) was published. The purpose of the book was to make up for a deficiency in criminalistics. He wrote it as an instructive book, focusing on human nature and the motives of a criminal. He presents his theories through psychological and material elements. Gross especially expanded on body language and the importance of the judge and the witness involved in a criminal case. He observes the behaviors of murderers, arsonists, thieves, and counterfeiters. Gross strongly focuses on the failings and inconsistencies of the judges and witnesses, the importance of materialistic evidence, and relating facts with reason. He believed that the study of psychology allowed one to understand the motives of criminals. Also, he relates chemistry, physics, botany, secret codes, and the use of blood to further determine facts and motives. He believed an overall education in these studies proved beneficial, especially to judges and investigating officers.

== Summary ==
Hans Gross made his mark in the world as a criminologist. He is associated with being the creator of the field of criminology after establishing the study at the Institute of Criminology in Graz. Throughout his life, he assisted in advancing the crime investigation world, especially in 1893 when the practice of criminology became more widespread. Introducing new investigation and observation techniques, such as crime scene photography and examining fingerprints, changed how the justice system functioned. His book, Handbuch für Untersuchungsrichter als System der Kriminalistik, contains revolutionary methods and ideas that greatly broadened criminal science. One of New York's famous Detective Agencies is named after him the Gross Investigation Bureau.

== See also ==
- August Vollmer

== Literature ==
- Sergij Neshurbida , M. P. Djatschuk, R. W. Sabadasch, N. M. Sahorodna: Hans Gross: Werke des Wissenschaftlers und Arbeiten über ihn aus den Bücherbeständen der wissenschaftlichen Bibliothek der Nationalen Jurij Fedkowytsch Universität Czernowitz. Zum 100. Todestag. Bibliografisches Verzeichnis / Hrsg. von S. I. Neshurbida, M. P. Djatschuk, R. W. Sabadasch, N. M. Sahorodna. Wissenschaftliche Redaktion: S. I. Neshurbida, E. D. Skulysh. Einleitende Artikel: S. I. Neshurbida, K. Probst. – Czernowitz, Knyhy - XXI, 2015. – 222 S. – Serie „Wissenschaftler der Universität Czernowitz“, ISBN 978-617-614-106-8
- Sergij Neshurbida : Hans Gross an der Franz-Josephs-Universitat Czernowitz (1899–1902): Leben Arbeit und wissenschaftliche Tatigkeit. In: Christian Bachhiesl, Sonja Bachhiesl, Johann Leitner (Hg.). Kriminologische Entwicklungslinien: Eine interdisziplinare Synopsis. LIT Verlag, S. 97-116.
- Sergei Nezhurbida: До 600-річчя м. Чернівці. Курс криміналістики для офіцерів-інструкторів австрійської жандармерії. Пер. з нім. П.Жуковський. Наукова редакція перекладу і передмова С.І.Нежурбіди. Науковий вісник Чернівецького університету: Збірник наук. праць. Вип. 427: Правознавство. – Чернівці: Рута, 2007. – 128 с. – С.5-10.
- Sergei Nezhurbida: Ганс Гросс: людина, вчений, вчитель. Вісник Академії прокуратури України. – 2006. - No. 3. – С.119-123.
- Sergei Nezhurbida , П.В. Жуковський: Курс криміналістики Ганса Гроcса для офіцерів-інструкторів австрійської жандармерії. Кримінальне право України. – 2006. - No. 10. – С.51-54
- Bachhiesl, Christian. The Graz School of Criminology – The Criminological Institute at The Karl-Franzens-University of Graz (1812-1978). Translation from English into Russian by Sergei Nezhurbida . The First Printed Criminalist. 2019, 18: 24-42. (in Russian)
- Mühlbacher, Thomas. Elementary, my dear Holmes! Hans Gross, Father of Criminalistics, and Arthur Conan Doyle. Translation from English into Russian by Sergei Nezhurbida . The First Printed Criminalist. 2019, 18: 11-23. (in Russian)
- Grassberger, Roland. Hans Gross (1847-1915). Translation from English into Russian by Sergei Nezhurbida . The First Printed Criminalist. 2017, 14: 75-87. (in Russian)
- Kaempffert, Waldemar. Criminal Communications. Translation from English into Russian by Sergei Nezhurbida . The First Printed Criminalist. 2016. 13: 104-118. (in Russian)
- Kaempffert, Waldemar. Crime-Master and How He Works. Translation from English into Russian by Sergei Nezhurbida . The First Printed Criminalist. 2016, 12: 138-157. (in Russian)
- Green, Martin (1999). Otto Gross, Freudian Psychoanalyst, 1877–1920. Lampeter: Edwin Mellen Press. ISBN 0-7734-8164-8.
