= Single-strand conformation polymorphism =

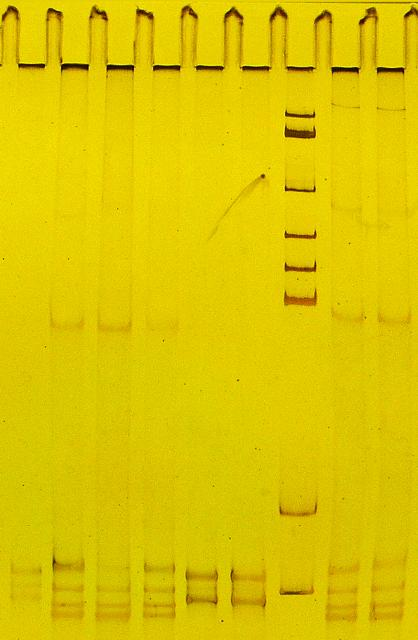
A single-strand conformation polymorphism gel where DNA was stained with silver staining.

Single-strand conformation polymorphism (SSCP), or single-strand chain polymorphism, is defined as a conformational difference of single-stranded nucleotide sequences of identical length as induced by differences in the sequences under certain experimental conditions. This property allows sequences to be distinguished by means of gel electrophoresis, which separates fragments according to their different conformations.

== Physical background ==
A single nucleotide change in a particular sequence, as seen in a double-stranded DNA, cannot be distinguished by gel electrophoresis techniques, which can be attributed to the fact that; the physical properties of the double strands are almost identical for both alleles. After denaturation, single-stranded DNA undergoes a characteristic 3-dimensional folding and may assume a unique conformational state based on its DNA sequence. The difference in shape between two single-stranded DNA strands with different sequences can cause them to migrate differently through an electrophoresis gel, even though the number of nucleotides is the same, which is, in fact, an application of SSCP.

== Applications in molecular biology ==
SSCP used to be a way to discover new DNA polymorphisms apart from DNA sequencing but is now being supplanted by sequencing techniques on account of efficiency and accuracy. These days, SSCP is most applicable as a diagnostic tool in molecular biology. For mutation screening, SSCP assays are usually designed around short PCR fragments because detection sensitivity falls as amplicon length increases; classic evaluations found an optimum around 150 bp, and review literature commonly describes fragments under 300 bp, preferably under 200 bp, as the practical range. It can be used in genotyping to detect homozygous individuals of different allelic states, as well as heterozygous individuals that should each demonstrate distinct patterns in an electrophoresis experiment. SSCP is also widely used in virology to detect variations in different strains of a virus, the idea being that a particular virus particle present in both strains will have undergone changes due to mutation, and that these changes will cause the two particles to assume different conformations and, thus, be differentiable on an SSCP gel.
