= Outline of forensic science =

Overview of and topical guide to forensic science

The following outline is provided as an overview of and topical guide to forensic science:

Forensic science – application of a broad spectrum of sciences to answer questions of interest to a legal system. This may be in matters relating to criminal law, civil law and regulatory laws. it may also relate to non-litigious matters. The term is often shortened to forensics.

== Nature of forensic science ==
General forensics topics include:

- Crime – breach of rules or laws for which some governing authority (via mechanisms such as legal systems) can ultimately prescribe a conviction.
- Crime scene – location where an illegal act took place, and comprises the area from which most of the physical evidence is retrieved by trained law enforcement personnel, crime scene investigators (CSIs) or in rare circumstances, forensic scientists.
- Mortuary investigations
- laboratory examinations
- CSI effect – phenomenon of popular television shows such as the CSI franchise raising the public's expectations of forensic science, stemming from the "dramatic license" taken by the shows' writers in which they exaggerate the abilities of forensic science, and this is of particular concern in the courtroom setting, where many prosecutors feel pressured to deliver more forensic evidence.

== Forensic methodologies ==
- Crime Scene Investigation: crime scene is the most fruitful source to gather forensic evidence (19)
- Forensic accounting – study and interpretation of accounting evidence.
- Forensic animation – branch of forensic science that creates audio-visual reconstructions of incidents
- Forensic anthropology – application of physical anthropology for personnel identification in a legal setting, usually for the recovery and identification of skeletonized human remains.
  - Forensic facial reconstruction – Skull-face photo superimposition. skull suture identification with ante mortem skull x-rays
- Forensic arts – artistic techniques used in the identification, apprehension, or conviction of wanted persons.
- Forensic astronomy – determines past celestial constellations for forensic purposes, using methods from astronomy.
- Bloodstain pattern analysis – draws on the scientific disciplines of biology, chemistry, mathematics and physics to ascertain the details and sequence of events of a crime, including the area of origin of an impact pattern, and movement of persons or objects after bloodshed, etc.
- Forensic botany – study of plant life in order to gain information regarding possible crimes.
- Forensic chemistry – study of detection and identification of illicit drugs, accelerants used in arson cases, explosive and gunshot residue.
- Computational forensics – quantitative approach involving computer-based modeling, computer simulation, analysis, and recognition in studying and solving problems posed in various forensic disciplines. Concerns the development of algorithms and software to assist forensic examination.
- Criminalistics – analysis of physical evidence in criminal investigations. Applies various sciences to answer questions relating to examination and comparison of biological evidence, trace evidence, impression evidence (such as fingerprints, footwear impressions, and tire tracks), controlled substances, ballistics, firearm and toolmark examination, and other evidence in criminal investigations. In typical circumstances, evidence is processed in a crime lab.
  - Forensic ballistics – methods of investigating the use of firearms and ammunition, and application of ballistics to legal questions.
    - Ballistic fingerprinting – forensic techniques that rely on marks that firearms leave on bullets to match a bullet to the gun it was fired with.
  - Forensic DNA analysis takes advantage of the uniqueness of an individual's DNA to answer forensic questions such as paternity/maternity testing or placing a suspect at a crime scene, e.g., in a rape investigation.
  - Impression evidence analysis
    - Forensic dactyloscopy – study of fingerprints.
    - Forensic podiatry is an application of the study of foot, footprint or footwear and their traces to analyze scene of crime and to establish personal identity in forensic examinations.
  - Forensic toxicology – the study of the effect of drugs and poisons on the human body.
  - Trace evidence analysis is the analysis and comparison of trace evidence including glass, paint, fibers, hair, etc.
- Digital forensics – application of proven scientific methods and techniques in order to recover or investigate data from electronic or digital media, often in relation to computer crime.
  - Mobile device forensics – scientific examination, and evaluation of evidences found in Mobile Phone, e.g. Call History, Deleted SMS etc., also include SIM Card Forensics
- Forensic document examination or questioned document examination answers questions about a disputed document using a variety of scientific processes and methods. Many examinations involve a comparison of the questioned document, or components of the document, to a set of known standards. The most common type of examination involves handwriting wherein the examiner tries to address concerns about potential authorship.
- Forensic economics – the study and interpretation of economic damage evidence to include present day calculations of lost earnings and benefits, lost earnings and profits, etc.
- Forensic engineering – investigation of materials, products, structures or components that fail or do not operate or function as intended, causing personal injury or damage to property. Also deals with retracing processes and procedures leading to accidents in operation of vehicles or machinery.
  - Forensic materials engineering – focuses on the material evidence from crime or accident scenes, seeking defects in those materials which might explain why an accident occurred, or the source of a specific material to identify a criminal.
    - Forensic polymer engineering – study of failure in polymeric products. Applicable in accident investigations.
- Forensic entomology – examination of insects in, on, and around human remains to assist in determination of time or location of death. It is also possible to determine if the body was moved after death.
- Forensic geology – examination and analysis of trace evidence in the form of soils, minerals and petroleum.
- Forensic identification – technology and procedures to identify specific objects from the trace evidence they leave, often at a crime scene or the scene of an accident.
- Forensic limnology – analysis of evidence collected from crime scenes in or around fresh water sources. Examination of biological organisms, in particular, diatoms, can be useful in connecting suspects with victims.
- Forensic linguistics – deals with issues in the legal system that requires linguistic expertise.
- Forensic meteorology – site specific analysis of past weather conditions for a point of loss.
- Forensic odontology – study of the uniqueness of teeth, mainly for the purpose of corpse identification
- Forensic optometry – study of glasses and other eyewear relating to crime scenes and criminal investigations
- Forensic pathology – a field in which the principles of medicine and pathology are applied to determine a cause of death or injury in the context of a legal inquiry.
- Forensic photography – the art of producing an accurate photographic reproduction of a crime scene to aid investigations and court proceedings.
- Forensic profiling –
- Forensic psychiatry – the two main areas of criminal evaluations in forensic psychiatry are evaluating a defendant's competency to stand trial (CST) and determining a defendant's mental state at the time of the offense (MSO).
- Forensic psychology – study of the mind of an individual, using forensic methods. Usually it determines the circumstances behind a criminal's behavior.
- Forensic seismology – study of techniques to distinguish the seismic signals generated by underground nuclear explosions from those generated by earthquakes.
- Forensic serology – study of the body fluids.
- Forensic video analysis – scientific examination, comparison, and evaluation of video in legal matters.
- Questioned document examination – the study and interpretation of evidence that takes the form of document.
- DNA in forensic entomology –
- Retrospective diagnosis –
- Statement analysis
- Digital Autopsy
- Lip Forensics- identifying suspects(terrorists) by studying the macro-structure of lips, namely, upper vermillion border, oral fissure and lower vermillion border#

== History of forensic science ==
=== By period ===
- Forensics in antiquity – ancient sources contain several accounts of techniques that foreshadow the concepts of forensic science that were made possible by the Scientific Revolution centuries later. Predating the scientific method, these techniques were not based on a scientific understanding of the world in the modern sense, but rather on common sense and practical experience.

=== By subject ===
- History of autopsies – Autopsies that opened the body to determine the cause of death were attested at least in the early third millennium BC, although they were opposed in many ancient societies where it was believed that the outward disfigurement of dead persons prevented them from entering the afterlife.
- History of dissection – Roman law forbade dissection and autopsy of the human body, so physicians such as Galen were unable to work on cadavers. Galen for example dissected the Barbary macaque and other primates, assuming their anatomy was basically the same as that of humans.

== Evidence ==
- Ballistic impact – high velocity impact by small mass simulation analogous to runway debris or small arms fire.
- Calling card – particular object sometimes left behind by a criminal at a scene of a crime, often as a way of taunting police or obliquely claiming responsibility.
- Fingerprint – an impression left by the friction ridges of a human finger. In a wider use of the term, fingerprints are the traces of an impression from the friction ridges of any part of a human or other primate hand.
- Footprints – impressions or images left behind by a person walking. Shoes have many different prints based on the sole design and the wear that it has received – this can help to identify suspects.
- Skid mark – mark a tire makes when a vehicle wheel stops rolling and slides or spins on the surface of the road. Skid marks are important for finding the maximum and minimum vehicle speed prior to the impact or incident.
- Trace evidence – evidence that occurs when different objects contact one another. Such materials are often transferred by heat induced by contact friction.

== Forensic tools ==
- Gas chromatography-mass spectrometer –Comparison Microscope-Spectrograph- gas analyzer- explosive detector
- Pollen calendar –

== Organizations ==
- American Academy of Forensic Sciences –
- Association of Firearm and Tool Mark Examiners –
- Canadian Identification Society –
- Forensic Science Society of India

== Forensic practitioners ==
- Michael Baden (1934 – ) – forensic pathologist known for his work investigating high-profile deaths and as a host of HBO's Autopsy.
- William M. Bass – U.S. forensic anthropologist, renowned for his research on human osteology and human decomposition.
- Joseph Bell (1837–1911) –
- Sara C. Bisel (1932–1996) –
- Ellis R. Kerley (1924–1998) –
- Paul L. Kirk (1902–1970) –
- Clea Koff (1972 – ) –
- Wilton M. Krogman (1903–1987) –
- Henry C. Lee (1938 – ) –
- P.Chandra Sekharan (1934-)
- Edmond Locard (1877–1966) –
- William R. Maples (1937–1997) –
- Keith Simpson (1907–1985) –
- Clyde Snow (1928-2014) –
- Bernard Spilsbury (1877–1947) –
- Auguste Ambroise Tardieu (1818–1879) –
- Paul Uhlenhuth (1870–1957) –
- Cyril Wecht (1931-2024) –
- Albert S. Osborn (1855-1946) – considered the father of the science of questioned document examination in North America

== Forensic science in popular culture ==
- CSI (franchise) –
  - CSI: Crime Scene Investigation – aka CSI: Las Vegas, a television series
    - CSI: Miami – a spin-off from the above show
      - CSI: NY – a spin-off from the above shows
  - CSI: Trilogy – a three-part television crossover between the above shows
  - CSI (comics) –
  - CSI (novels) –
  - CSI (video games) –
- Dick Tracy –
- Forensic Files – a documentary style show that reveals the use of forensic science in a criminal investigation
- Sherlock Holmes –

== See also ==
- Diplomatics – focuses on the analysis of document creation, its inner constitutions and form, the means of transmitting information, and the relationship documented facts have with their creator. These may be evidences of the intention of conveying information.
- Biometric identification
- Computer forensics
- Data remanence
- Digital traces
- Entomological evidence collection
- Forensic dentistry (odontology)
- Forensic profiling
- Identification (biology)
- Crime scene
- CSI effect
- Perry Mason syndrome
- Pollen calendar
- Skid mark
- Trace evidence

Place these

- Physiological
  - Anthropology
  - Biology
  - Bloodstain pattern analysis
  - Botany
  - Dentistry
  - DNA phenotyping
  - DNA profiling
  - Entomology
  - Epidemiology
  - Medicine
  - Palynology
  - Pathology
  - Podiatry
  - Toxicology
- Social
  - Psychiatry
  - Psychology
  - Psychotherapy
  - Social work
- Criminalistics
  - Accounting
  - Body identification
  - Chemistry
  - Facial reconstruction
  - Fingerprint analysis
  - Firearm examination
  - Footwear evidence
  - Forensic arts
  - Profiling
  - Gloveprint analysis
  - Palmprint analysis
  - Questioned document examination
  - Vein matching
- Digital forensics
  - Computer exams
  - Data analysis
  - Database study
  - Mobile devices
  - Network analysis
  - Photography
  - Video analysis
  - Audio analysis
- Related disciplines
  - Electrical engineering
  - Engineering
  - Fire investigation
  - Fire accelerant detection
  - Fractography
  - Linguistics
  - Materials engineering
  - Polymer engineering
  - Statistics
  - Traffic collision reconstruction
