= Envista Forensics =

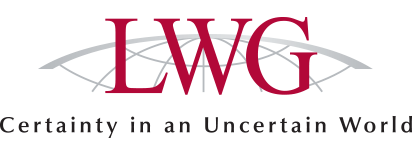
- Formerly: LWG Consulting, Inc.
- Founded: 1988
- Headquarters: Northbrook, United States
- Number of locations: 30
- Key people: Robert Wedoff (CEO and president)
- Number of employees: 599
- Website: www.envistaforensics.com

Envista Forensics is a United States-based company that provides forensic engineering and recovery solutions for the insurance, legal, and risk management industries in the United States and internationally. Originally LWG Consulting, Inc., The company rebranded itself as Envista Forensics in 2017.

== History ==
LWG Consulting was started in 1975 by the entrepreneurial engineer Frank Lombardo when he saw an opportunity to assist insurance adjusters in resolving claims involving complex electronics. The company includes professionals in over 20 offices around the world. It provides services of post-disaster technical solutions.

== Overview ==
The company offers failure analysis, forensic investigations in the cause of various failures, including electrical systems, mechanical systems, and structural systems; fire origin and cause investigations in the areas, such as buildings, vehicles, and machinery; vehicle accident reconstruction; damage assessments caused by fires, flooding, storms, lightning, earthquakes, and other disasters; identification and assessment of damage repair and replacement options; and witness testimony and other forms of litigation support.

== Services ==
Services this company provides include damage assessment, repair and replacement cost valuation, equipment restoration feasibility studies, cause and origin determination, and electronic incident investigation. It also provides IT equipment failure analysis service. Currently, the company has 30 offices around the world.
