= Cracking pattern =

Cracking pattern may refer to:

- Cracking pattern (engineering), the fracture surfaces of materials
- Cracking pattern (painting), the fine pattern of dense cracking formed on the surface of paintings
- Patterns in nature#Cracks, the patterns formed by cracks of different types in nature
