= Forensic polymer engineering =

Study of failure in polymeric products

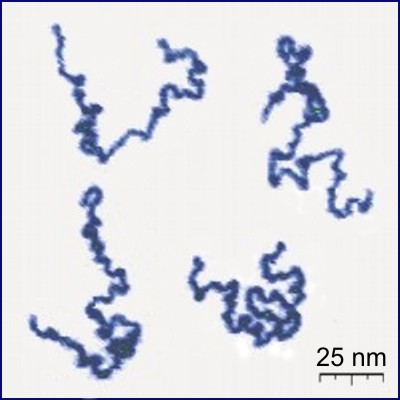
Appearance of real linear polymer chains as recorded under liquid medium using an atomic force microscope

Forensic polymer engineering is the study of failure in polymeric products. The topic includes the fracture of plastic products, or any other reason why such a product fails in service, or fails to meet its specification. The subject focuses on the material evidence from crime or accident scenes, seeking defects in those materials that might explain why an accident occurred, or the source of a specific material to identify a criminal. Many analytical methods used for polymer identification may be used in investigations, the exact set being determined by the nature of the polymer in question, be it thermoset, thermoplastic, elastomeric or composite in nature.

One aspect is the analysis of trace evidence such as skid marks on exposed surfaces, where contact between dissimilar materials leaves material traces of one left on the other. Provided the traces can be analyzed successfully, then an accident or crime can often be reconstructed.

== Methods of analysis ==
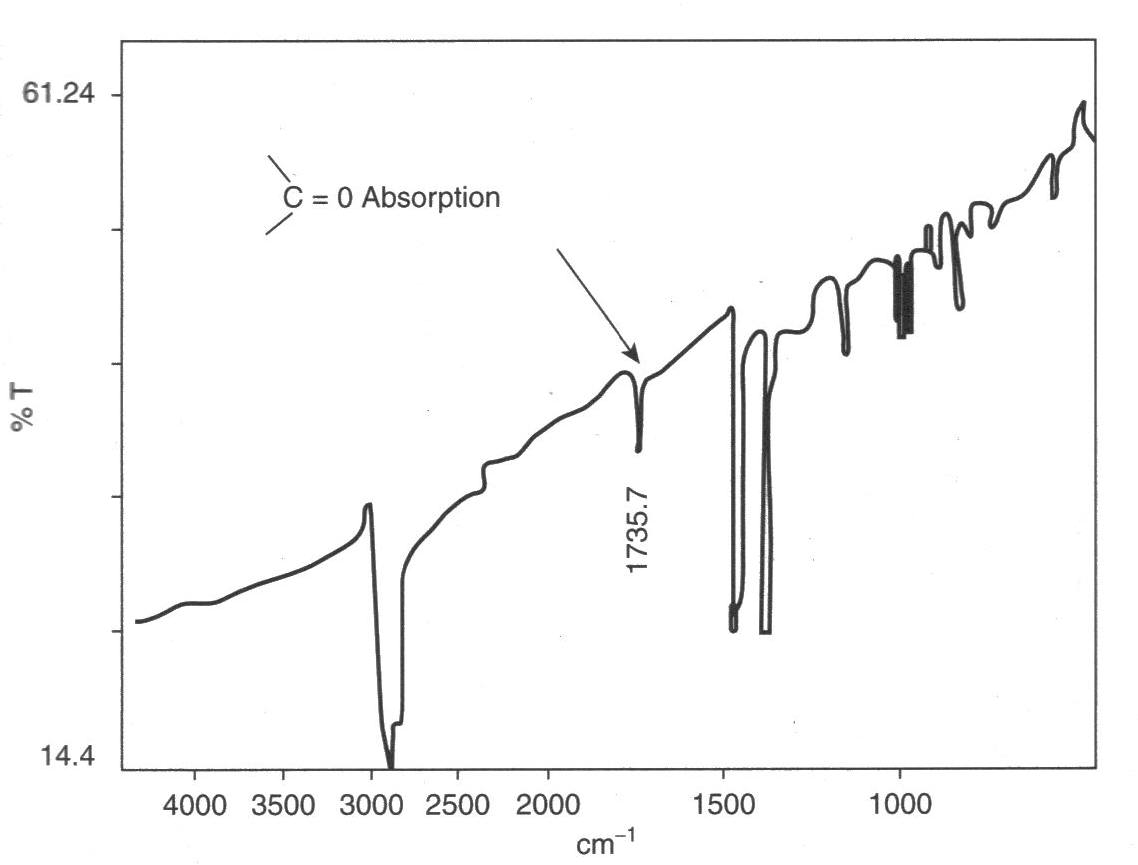
IR spectrum showing carbonyl absorption due to oxidative degradation of polypropylene

Thermoplastics can be analysed using infra-red spectroscopy, ultraviolet–visible spectroscopy, nuclear magnetic resonance spectroscopy and the environmental scanning electron microscope. Failed samples can either be dissolved in a suitable solvent and examined directly (UV, IR and NMR spectroscopy) or be a thin film cast from solvent or cut using microtomy from the solid product. Infra-red spectroscopy is especially useful for assessing oxidation of polymers, such as the polymer degradation caused by faulty injection moulding. The spectrum shows the characteristic carbonyl group produced by oxidation of polypropylene, which made the product brittle. It was a critical part of a crutch, and when it failed, the user fell and injured herself very seriously. The spectrum was obtained from a thin film cast from a solution of a sample of the plastic taken from the failed forearm crutch.

Microtomy is preferable since there are no complications from solvent absorption, and the integrity of the sample is partly preserved. Thermosets, composites and elastomers can often be examined using only microtomy owing to the insoluble nature of these materials.

== Fracture ==
Fractured products can be examined using fractography, an especially useful method for all broken components using macrophotography and optical microscopy. Although polymers usually possess quite different properties to metals, ceramics and glasses, they are just as susceptible to failure from mechanical overload, fatigue and stress corrosion cracking if products are poorly designed or manufactured.

Scanning electron microscopy or ESEM is especially useful for examining fracture surfaces and can also provide elemental analysis of viewed parts of the sample being investigated. It is effectively a technique of microanalysis and valuable for examination of trace evidence. On the other hand, colour rendition is absent in ESEM, and there is no information provided about the way in which those elements are bonded to one another. Specimens will be exposed to a partial vacuum, so any volatiles may be removed, and surfaces may be contaminated by substances used to attach the sample to the mount.

== Examples ==
Many polymers are attacked by specific chemicals in the environment, and serious problems can arise, including road accidents and personal injury. Polymer degradation leads to sample embrittlement, and fracture under low applied loads.

=== Ozone cracking ===
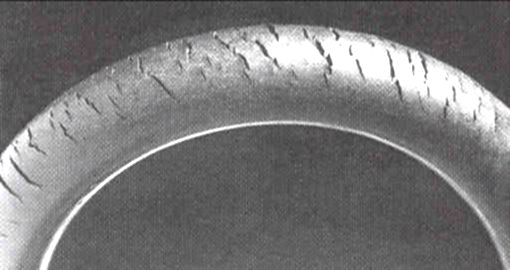
Ozone cracking in Natural rubber tubing

Polymers for example, can be attacked by aggressive chemicals, and if under load, then cracks will grow by the mechanism of stress corrosion cracking. Perhaps the oldest known example is the ozone cracking of rubbers, where traces of ozone in the atmosphere attack double bonds in the chains of the materials. Elastomers with double bonds in their chains include natural rubber, nitrile rubber and styrene-butadiene rubber. They are all highly susceptible to ozone attack, and can cause problems like vehicle fires (from rubber fuel lines) and tyre blow-outs. Nowadays, anti-ozonants are widely added to these polymers, so the incidence of cracking has dropped. However, not all safety-critical rubber products are protected, and, since only ppb of ozone will start attack, failures are still occurring.

=== Chlorine-induced cracking ===
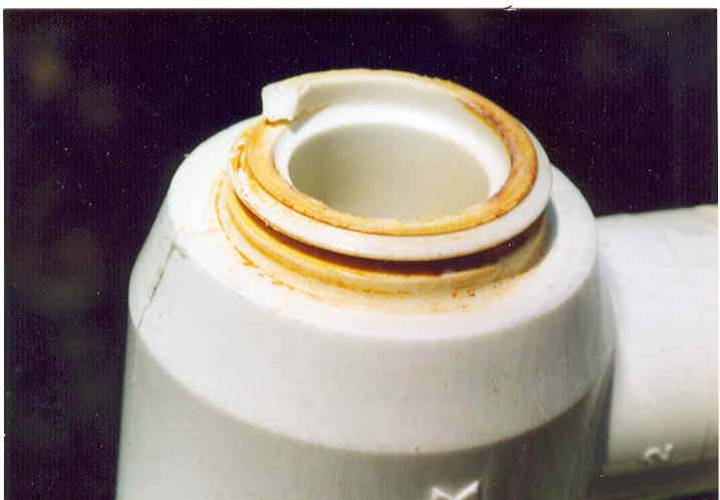
chlorine attack of acetal resin plumbing joint

Another highly reactive gas is chlorine, which will attack susceptible polymers such as acetal resin and polybutylene pipework. There have been many examples of such pipes and acetal fittings failing in properties in the US as a result of chlorine-induced cracking. Essentially the gas attacks sensitive parts of the chain molecules (especially secondary, tertiary or allylic carbon atoms), oxidising the chains and ultimately causing chain cleavage. The root cause is traces of chlorine in the water supply, added for its anti-bacterial action, attack occurring even at parts per million traces of the dissolved gas. The chlorine attacks weak parts of a product, and, in the case of an acetal resin junction in a water supply system, it is the thread roots that were attacked first, causing a brittle crack to grow. The discoloration on the fracture surface was caused by deposition of carbonates from the hard water supply, so the joint had been in a critical state for many months.

=== Hydrolysis ===
Most step-growth polymers can suffer hydrolysis in the presence of water, often a reaction catalysed by acid or alkali. Nylon for example, will degrade and crack rapidly if exposed to strong acids, a phenomenon well known to people who accidentally spill acid onto their tights.

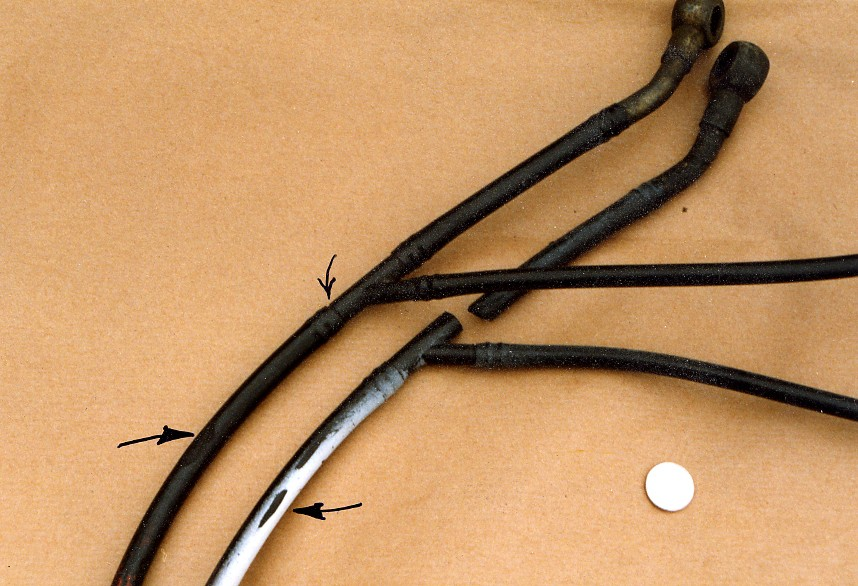
Failed fuel pipe at right from road traffic accident

The broken fuel pipe caused a serious accident when diesel fuel poured out from a van onto the road. A following car skidded and the driver was seriously injured when she collided with an oncoming lorry. Scanning electron microscopy or SEM showed that the nylon connector had fractured by stress corrosion cracking due to a small leak of battery acid. Nylon is susceptible to hydrolysis in contact with sulfuric acid, and only a small leak of acid would have sufficed to start a brittle crack in the injection moulded connector by a mechanism known as stress corrosion cracking, or SCC.

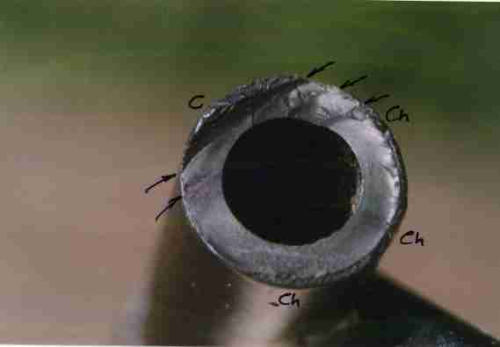
Close-up of broken fuel pipe

The crack took about 7 days to grow across the diameter of the tube, hence the van driver should have seen the leak well before the crack grew to a critical size. He did not, therefore resulting in the accident. The fracture surface showed a mainly brittle surface with striations indicating progressive growth of the crack across the diameter of the pipe. Once the crack had penetrated the inner bore, fuel started leaking onto the road. Diesel is especially hazardous on road surfaces because it forms a thin oily film that cannot be seen easily by drivers. It is akin to black ice in lubricity, so skids are common when diesel leaks occur. The insurers of the van driver admitted liability and the injured driver was compensated.

Polycarbonate is susceptible to alkali hydrolysis, the reaction simply depolymerising the material. Polyesters are prone to degrade when treated with strong acids, and in all these cases, care must be taken to dry the raw materials for processing at high temperatures to prevent the problem occurring.

=== UV degradation ===
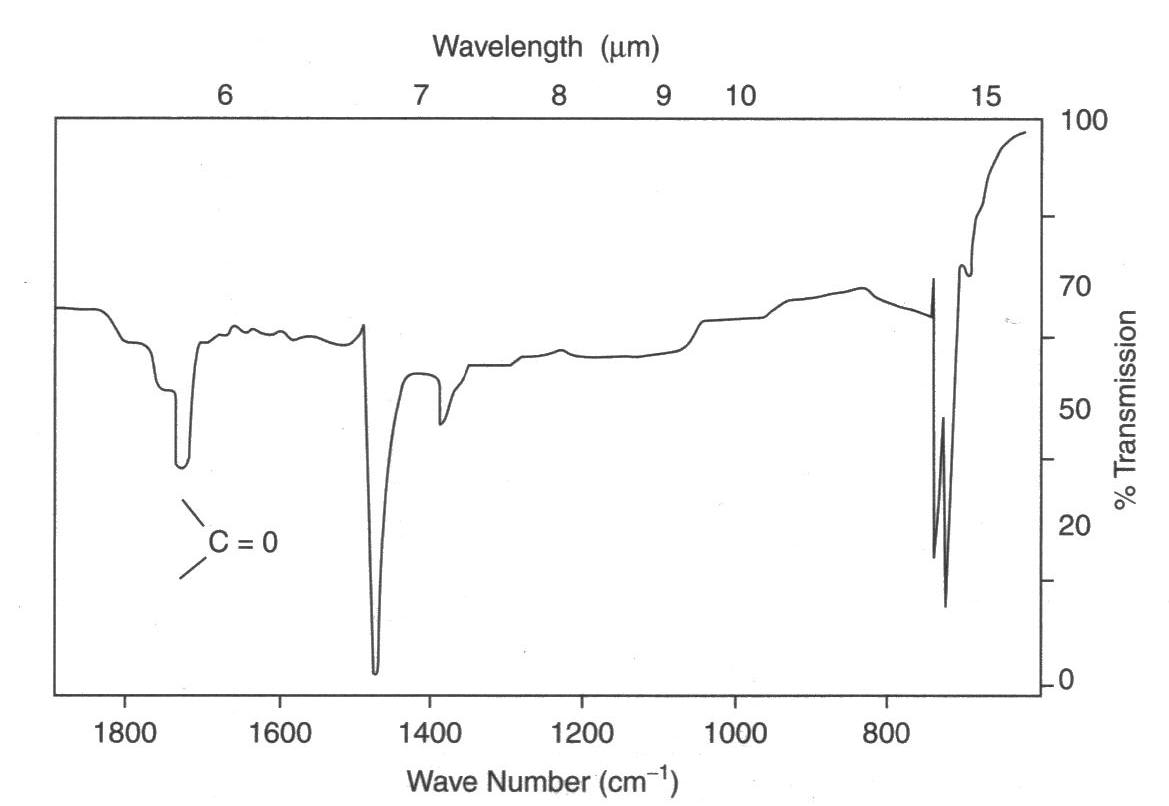
IR spectrum showing carbonyl absorption due to UV degradation of polyethylene

Many polymers are also attacked by UV radiation at vulnerable points in their chain structures. Thus polypropylene suffers severe cracking in sunlight unless anti-oxidants are added. The point of attack occurs at the tertiary carbon atom present in every repeat unit, causing oxidation and finally chain breakage. Polyethylene is also susceptible to UV degradation, especially those variants that are branched polymers such as LDPE. The branch points are tertiary carbon atoms, so polymer degradation starts there and results in chain cleavage, and embrittlement. In the example shown at right, carbonyl groups were easily detected by IR spectroscopy from a cast thin film. The product was a road cone that had cracked in service, and many similar cones also failed because an anti-UV additive had not been used.

== See also ==
- Applied spectroscopy
- Catastrophic failure
- Circumstantial evidence
- Environmental stress cracking
- Forensic chemistry
- Forensic electrical engineering
- Forensic evidence
- Forensic photography
- Forensic engineering
- Forensic materials engineering
- Forensic science
- Fractography
- Ozone cracking
- Polymer degradation
- Skid mark
- Stress corrosion cracking
- Trace evidence
- UV degradation
