= Trace evidence =

Type of evidence of physical contact

Trace evidence occurs when objects make contact, and material is transferred. This type of evidence is usually not visible to the naked eye and requires specific tools and techniques to be located and obtained. Due to this, trace evidence is often overlooked, and investigators must be trained to detect it. When it comes to an investigation trace evidence can come in many different forms and is found in a wide variety of cases. This evidence can link a victim to suspects and a victim or suspect to the crime scene.

There are three general categories in which forensic science uses trace evidence. It can be used for investigative aids, associative evidence, and in-scene reconstructions. In terms of investigative aids, trace evidence can provide information to determine the origin of a sample and determine the manufacture date of the material, all of which can limit potential suspects in a case. Associative evidence can associate with or link victims or suspects to a crime scene. For reconstructions, trace evidence can provide information to understand how a crime occurred or the events that occurred before the crime.

== Importance ==
The importance of trace evidence in criminal investigations was shown by Edmond Locard in the early 20th century, with his exchange principle, that every contact leaves a trace. This statement can then be expanded by stating trace evidence must first be located and recorded before it can be recovered and analyzed. Since then, forensic scientists use trace evidence to reconstruct crimes and to describe the people, places, and things involved in them. Studies of homicides published in the forensic science literature show how trace evidence is used to solve crimes.

== Examples and cases ==
Trace evidence is found in many different forms with some examples including, but not limited, to fire debris, gunshot residue, glass fragments, and fibres. Each of these types of evidence will have a trained analyst in that specific field who will conduct the analysis on these items.

Some case examples of the use of trace evidence could include a Vehicular accident reconstruction which relies on marks such as tire impressions to estimate vehicle speed before and during an accident, as well as braking and impact forces. Fibres from clothing worn by a pedestrian found in the paint and/or road grime of a striking vehicle can be linked to the specific vehicle involved in a hit-and-run collision. "Witness marks" are also an important form of trace evidence, especially in engineering and may be critical in understanding how a product failed. A typical witness mark could be an impact depression which broke a product. It is especially useful if that mark can be linked to the product which made the impact such as a hammer or nail. Such marks are also commonly encountered in criminal cases and include bite marks, puncture marks, bullet holes, etc.

== Recording and recovery ==
After the trace evidence has been located at a crime scene the next step is to record it. There are multiple ways of recording evidence and that is dependant on the type of evidence found. The first option is to videotape the crime scene. This can be done to provide perspective on the actual location of the evidence throughout the entire scene. The next step in recording the evidence would be still photographs. The images included should be photos of the evidence both with flash and without, the evidence with a ruler for size reference, and the evidence with its number in the photo.

As for the recovery of the evidence, samples may be collected by handpicking, tape lifts, combing, or removal of an entire object. Hand picking is straightforward, with the evidence being carefully picked up by hand or with forceps and placed in the proper packaging for that specific item. Tape lifts are used when the item cannot be picked up by hand or with forceps. It involves the sticky side of tape being placed on the evidence and then carefully lifting and placing it either on a sheet of clear acetate or on its original packaging. Combing is used when trace evidence needs to be removed from a person who is either alive or deceased. A different comb should be used for each piece of evidence being removed and the combs and paper must be packaged separate from the evidence. The removal of an entire object occurs when the evidence simply can not be removed from this object. The collection method used is entirely based on what the evidence type is and the surface it is on. It is also important to note that great care must be taken to prevent contamination of the evidence with other substances (such as natural oil and sweat on the hand of the collector).

Trace Evidence is also found in much smaller amounts at crime scenes.

The Scientific Working Group Materials Analysis (SWGMAT) has created guidelines to ensure proper protection and collection of trace evidence. In this document you can find steps to ensure proper documentation, tips to avoid contamination and loss of evidence, proper detection, collection, and preservation techniques, as well as considerations for specific types of trace materials. The Federal Bureau of Investigation (FBI), has even implemented these standards into their work revolving trace evidence.

Following these standards and guidelines will ensure accurate analysis of crime scene evidence and increase the strength of the evidence in courts.

== Analysis ==
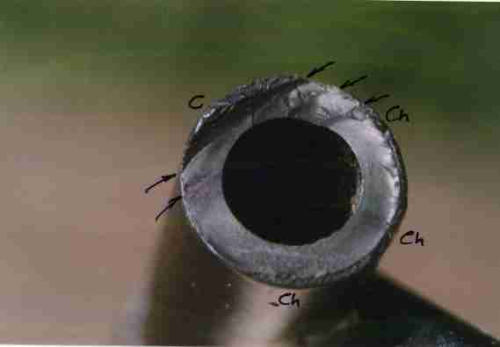
Close-up of broken fuel pipe using optical microscopy

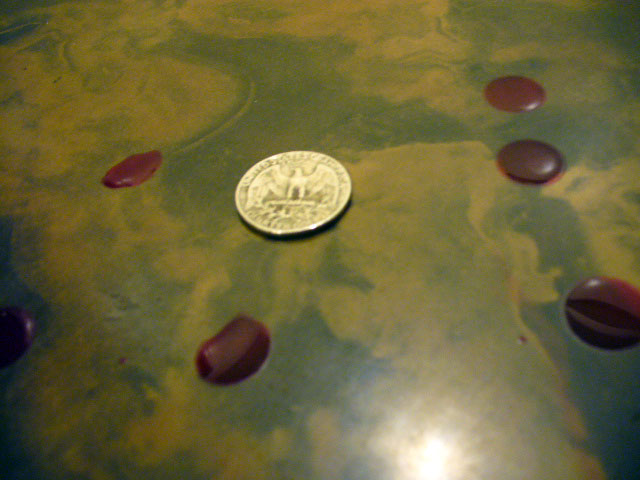
Droplets of human blood. The droplets are round and show no splattering, indicating they impacted relatively slowly, in this case from a height of two feet.

The way the analysis of trace evidence is performed is dependent on the evidence being examined. Most commonly the trace evidence that is examined is microscopic due to the fact that it can not be examined by the naked eye. In this case, there are many different types of microscopes that can be used including stereomicroscope, scanning electron microscope (SEM) or comparison microscope. SEM is especially useful because X-ray analysis can be conducted on selected areas of the sample. This can be especially useful as chemical residues can show unusual elements present which may indicate a chemical attack of the product. A car accident caused by a diesel fuel leak, for example, showed traces of sulfur on the cracked tube indicative of an attack by sulfuric acid from the battery.

When it comes to impression trace analysis such as a tire track in mud or a footprint, a cast or lift may be made of the impression. This would allow the analyst to identify what made the impression for example, the type of tire, the manufaturure as well as the condition of the tire.

The first step in examining gunshot residue is of course using a microscope to observe propellant residue particles which could include gun powder, lead and other materials depending on the type of propellant used. Tests like the Modified Griess Test and the Sodium Rhodizinate Test are wet chemical techniques used to develop residue that can not be seen. Small amounts of explosives, volatile hydrocarbons, and other chemicals are identified with the use of analytical instruments, such as gas chromatography, mass spectrometry, and infrared spectroscopy, all of which separate out the components of the chemicals.

Similar comments apply to damaged items from an accident scene, but care is needed in ensuring that the sample is not damaged by the testing or sampling for testing. Such nondestructive testing must always be used first before considering destructive methods which involve taking small samples from the item for more detailed tests, such as spectroscopic analysis. Use of all such methods must be done in consultation with other experts and the relevant authorities, such as lawyers on both sides of a case.

== Problems ==
False positives and contamination by subsequent handling or nearby objects (e.g. mixing of blood from victim and attacker), are problems of many common substances and the necessity of human involvement in the collection of trace evidence. Both can occur with DNA traces and fingerprints, and therefore evidence should be collected, analyzed, and presented in accordance with established guidelines. Partial fingerprints are even more vulnerable to false positives. Samples from accidents or crimes should therefore be protected as much as possible by enclosure in a sealable container as soon as possible, after an incident is under investigation.

In terms of scientific research that is being conducted for trace evidence, there are many gaps and a lot that remains to be done. No standards and methodologies have been created to determine physical fit between two piece of evidence and consistency of work conducted from various analysts. Therefore, it is up to the analysts discretion to determine how likely it is that the two samples came from the same source. The Organization of Scientific Area Committees (OSAC) have clarified that future research must be conducted to create methods for quality of fit and error rates.

Improving this field of forensic science will improve the quality of samples and develop quality case reports

== See also ==
- Blowback, material drawn into the barrel of a firearm post discharge
- Digital traces
- Evidence packaging
- Forensic chemistry
- Forensic engineering
- Forensic materials engineering
- Forensic polymer engineering
- Forensic photography
- Forensic profiling
- Forensic science
- Locard's exchange principle, which states that when two objects come into contact, there is an exchange of material
- Skid mark
