= Circumstantial evidence =

Evidence indirectly supporting conclusion

Circumstantial evidence is evidence that relies on an inference to connect it to a conclusion of fact, such as a fingerprint at the scene of a crime. By contrast, direct evidence supports the truth of an assertion directly, i.e. without need for any additional evidence or inference.

== Overview ==
On its own, circumstantial evidence allows for more than one explanation. Different pieces of circumstantial evidence may be required, so that each corroborates the conclusions drawn from the others. Together, they may more strongly support one particular inference over another. An explanation involving circumstantial evidence becomes more likely once alternative explanations have been ruled out. Circumstantial evidence allows a trier of fact to infer that a fact exists. In criminal law, the inference is made by the trier of fact to support the truth of an assertion (of guilt or absence of guilt).

Reasonable doubt is tied into circumstantial evidence as that evidence relies on inference. It was put in place because the circumstantial evidence may not be enough to convict someone fairly. Reasonable doubt is described as the highest standard of proof used in court and means that a juror can find the defendant guilty of the crime to a moral certainty. Even when circumstantial evidence is not sufficient to convict or acquit, it can contribute to other decisions made about the case.

Testimony can be direct evidence or it can be circumstantial. For example, a witness saying that she saw a defendant stab a victim is providing direct evidence. By contrast, a witness saying that she saw a defendant enter a house, heard screaming, and saw the defendant leave with a bloody knife is circumstantial evidence. It is the need for inference, and not the obviousness of the fact inferred, that determines whether evidence is circumstantial.

Forensic evidence supplied by an expert witness is usually treated as circumstantial evidence. For example, a forensic scientist or forensic engineer may provide results of tests indicating that bullets were fired from a defendant's gun, or that a car was traveling over the speed limit, but not necessarily that the defendant fired the gun or was driving the car. Circumstantial evidence is especially important when there is little or no direct evidence.

== Civil law ==
Circumstantial evidence is used in civil courts to establish or refute liability. It is usually the most common form of evidence, for example in product liability cases and road traffic accidents. Forensic analysis of skid marks can frequently allow a reconstruction of the accident. By measuring the length of such marks and using dynamic analysis of the car and road conditions at the time of the accident, it may be found that a driver underestimated his or her speed. Circumstantial evidence is also prevalent in attempts to recover damages from alleged tortfeasors.

== Criminal law ==
Circumstantial evidence is used in criminal courts to establish guilt or innocence through reasoning. With obvious exceptions (immature, incompetent, or mentally ill individuals), most criminals try to avoid generating direct evidence. Hence, the prosecution usually must resort to circumstantial evidence to prove the existence of mens rea, or intent.

One example of circumstantial evidence is the behavior of a person around the time of an alleged offense. In the case of someone charged with theft of money, were the suspect seen in a shopping spree purchasing expensive items shortly after the time of the alleged theft, the spree might prove to be circumstantial evidence of the individual's guilt.

=== Forensic evidence ===
Other examples of circumstantial evidence are fingerprint analysis, blood analysis or DNA analysis of the evidence found at the scene of a crime. These types of evidence may strongly point to a certain conclusion when taken into consideration with other facts—but if not directly witnessed by someone when the crime was committed, they are still considered circumstantial; however, when proved by expert witnesses, they are usually sufficient to decide a case, especially in the absence of any direct evidence. Owing to subsequent developments in forensic methods, old undecided cases (or cold cases) are frequently resolved.

=== Validity of circumstantial evidence ===
A popular misconception is that circumstantial evidence is less valid or less important than direct evidence, which is popularly assumed to be the most powerful, but this is not the case. Many successful criminal prosecutions rely largely or entirely on circumstantial evidence, and civil charges are frequently based on circumstantial or indirect evidence. The common metaphor for the strongest possible evidence in any case—the "smoking gun"—is an example of proof based on circumstantial evidence. Similarly, fingerprint evidence, videotapes, sound recordings, photographs, and many other examples of physical evidence that support the drawing of an inference, i.e. circumstantial evidence, are considered very strong possible evidence.

In practice, circumstantial evidence can have an advantage over direct evidence in that it can come from multiple sources that check and reinforce each other. Eyewitness testimony can be inaccurate at times, and many persons have been convicted on the basis of perjured or otherwise mistaken testimony. Thus, strong circumstantial evidence can provide a more reliable basis for a verdict. Circumstantial evidence normally requires a witness, such as the police officer who found the evidence, or an expert who examined it, to lay the foundation for its admission. This witness, sometimes known as the sponsor or the authenticating witness, is giving direct (eyewitness) testimony, and could present credibility problems in the same way that any eyewitness does.

Eyewitness testimony is frequently unreliable, or subject to conflict or outright fabrication. For example, the RMS Titanic sank in the presence of approximately 700 witnesses. For many years, there was vigorous debate on whether the ship broke into two before sinking. It was not until the ship was found in September 1985 that the truth was known; however, there is often more than one logical conclusion naturally inferred from the same set of circumstances. In cases where one conclusion implies a defendant's guilt and another his innocence, the "benefit of the doubt" principle would apply. If the circumstantial evidence suggests a possibility of innocence, the prosecution has the burden of disproving that possibility.

==== Examples ====
Much of the evidence against convicted American terrorist Timothy McVeigh was circumstantial. Speaking about McVeigh's trial, Robert Precht said that "the prosecution's use of indirect evidence is no cause for worry". McVeigh was sentenced to death and subsequently executed by the US federal government, while his accomplice was sentenced to serve consecutive federal life sentences. The 2004 murder trial of Scott Peterson for the murder of his wife Laci Peterson was another high-profile conviction based heavily on circumstantial evidence, leading to Peterson's being sentenced to death. Peterson was subsequently spared execution, and in December of 2021 was re-sentenced to life in prison without the possibility of parole. Another case that relied on circumstantial evidence was that of Nelson Serrano, who received four death sentences for four first-degree murders. The 2015 murder trial of Ivan Chan Man-sum from Hong Kong was a conviction based solely on circumstantial evidence, without finding the body of his murdered girlfriend. Chan was consequently sentenced to mandatory life imprisonment.

In Singapore, law student Sunny Ang was sentenced to death in 1965 solely based on circumstantial evidence when he was convicted of murdering his girlfriend during a scuba diving trip near Sisters' Islands on 27 August 1963. The victim, Jenny Cheok, was murdered for her insurance money, which amounted to $450,000. Her body has never been found. The additional absence of Cheok's body made Ang's conviction one of the landmark verdicts in Singapore, where it involved a murder conviction without a body. A famous aphorism on the probity of circumstantial evidence was penned by Henry David Thoreau, who wrote: "Some circumstantial evidence is very strong, as when you find a trout in the milk."

== See also ==
- Consciousness of guilt
- Expert witness
- Forensic engineering
- Forensic science
- Hearsay
- Inculpatory evidence
