= Murder book =

Police case file of a murder investigation

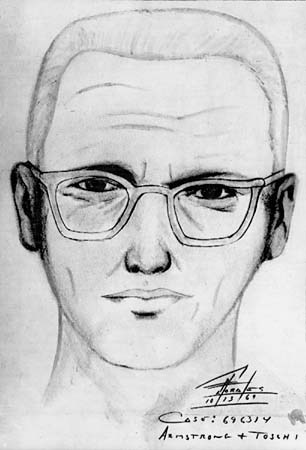
Zodiac Killer composite sketch, 1969, San Francisco Police Department

In law enforcement parlance, the term murder book refers to the case file of a murder investigation. Typically, murder books include crime scene photographs and sketches, autopsy and forensic reports, transcripts of investigators' notes, and witness interviews. The murder book encapsulates the complete paper trail of a murder investigation, from the time the murder is first reported through the arrest of a suspect.

Law enforcement agencies typically guard murder books carefully, and it is unusual for civilians to be given unfettered access to these kinds of records, especially for unsolved cases.

== In modern culture ==
=== In films and television ===
- In the thriller novel The Murder Book (2002) by Jonathan Kellerman, a murder book is sent to psychologist Alex Delaware, renewing the hunt for a murderer in a 20-year-old case.
- A murder book featured heavily in the plot of the 2006/2008 ABC miniseries Day Break.
- Episode 387–1716 of the TV series Law & Order is titled "Murder Book" (2007).
- Murder Book (2014–2016) is an American television series on the Investigation Discovery channel.
- In the film of the Michael Connelly novel Blood Work, the murder book is a key investigative tool to find a suspect in several killings.

=== In literature and publications ===
American crime novelist Michael Connelly makes regular references to the meticulous murder books kept by LAPD detective Harry Bosch, particularly in The Black Echo, The Concrete Blonde, The Last Coyote, Trunk Music, The Closers, and The Drop. In 2020, Connelly created a true crime podcast titled Murder Book.

Novelist Lisa Gray makes regular references to murder books in her Jessica Shaw novels.
