= Forensic materials engineering =

Branch of forensic engineering

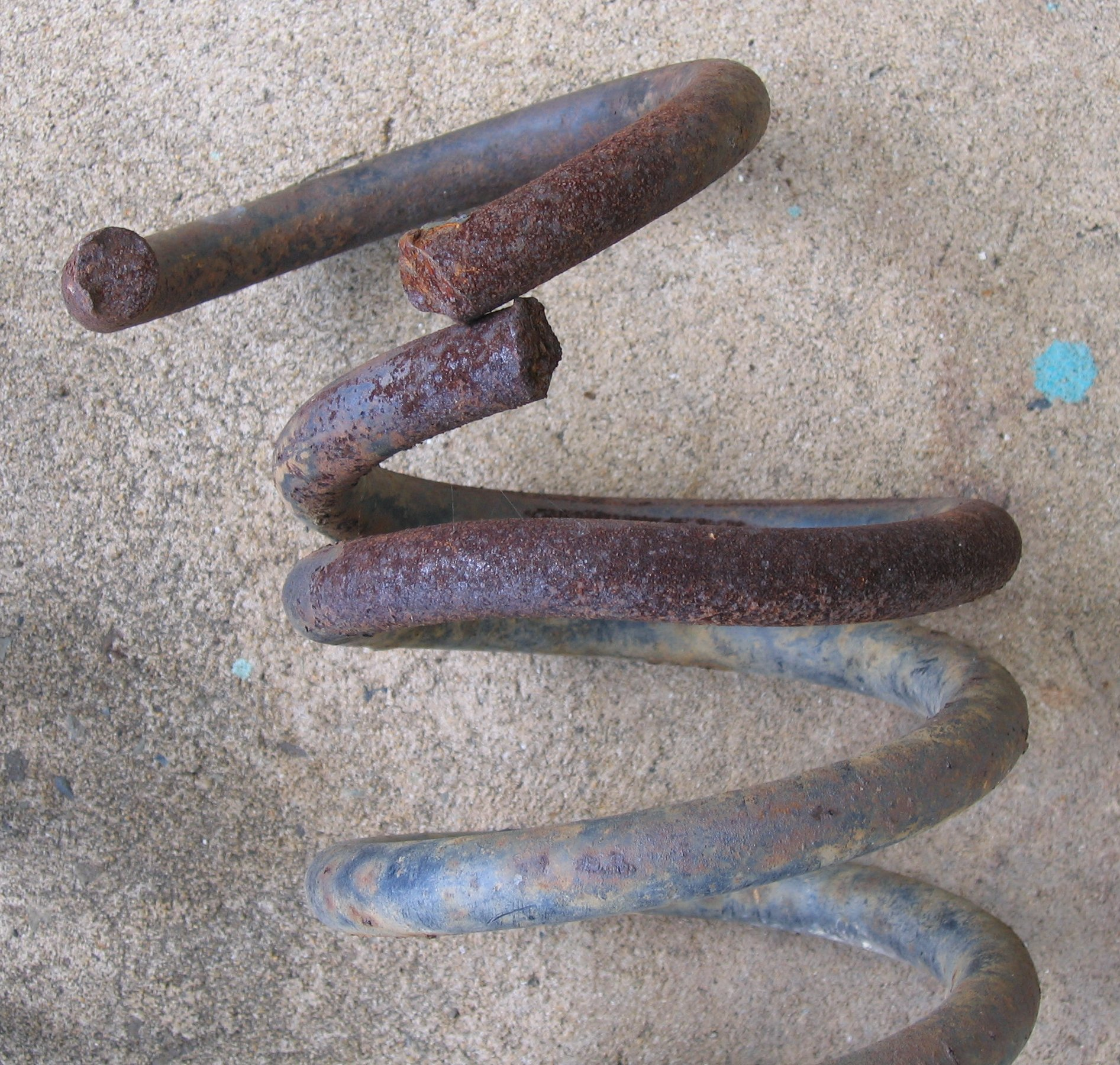
A car suspension coil spring that has been oxy-cut

Forensic materials engineering, a branch of forensic engineering, focuses on the material evidence from crime or accident scenes, seeking defects in those materials which might explain why an accident occurred, or the source of a specific material to identify a criminal.

Many analytical methods used for material identification may be used in investigations, the exact set being determined by the nature of the material in question, be it metal, glass, ceramic, polymer or composite. An important aspect is the analysis of trace evidence such as skid marks on exposed surfaces, where contact between dissimilar materials leaves material traces of one left on the other.

Provided the traces can be analysed successfully, then an accident or crime can often be reconstructed. Another aim will be to determine the cause of a broken component using the technique of fractography.

Forensic materials engineers are often involved in product failures (e.g., a critical component of a safety device), process failures (e.g., a manufacturing does not produce materials with acceptable properties for an application), and design failures (e.g., many products prematurely fail).

== Definition ==
=== Defects ===
Many different types of defects, which are often investigated and characterized through the process of Failure Analysis, may be involved in the crime or accident to cause some sort of failure. For example, there are primary and secondary defects that may occur in products designed for consumer use.

Defects may exist prior to use: a primary defect, or defects may develop during use. Moreover, primary defects may also turn into secondary defects over time. Forensic materials engineers are involved in examining the scenario and identifying relevant defects and their probability in being causal factors in the crime or accident.

Typical Product Defects
	Primary Defects	Secondary Defects
Design: geometry	Dimensions (over/under fit); Stress concentrations (sharp corners)	Cracks from stress concentrations
Design: materials	Poor quality materials; 1, 2, 3 dimensional flaws; Contamination	Degradation
Manufacture	Poor forming, shaping, etc.; Weld lines; Improper heat treating; Contamination; Cracks	Distortion over time
Assembly	Poor fit; Poor welding, etc.; Creation of residual stresses	Cracks from residual stresses
Finishing	Surface flaws; Packing flaws	Degradation on surface Cracks form over time

=== Causal Factors ===
Possible causes of failure including a subset of probable causes and causal factors.

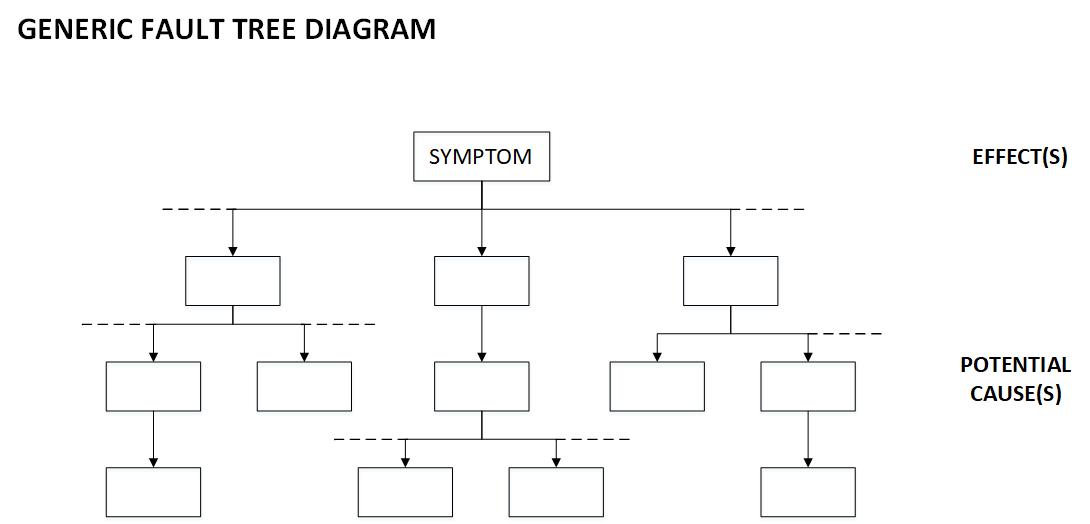
A Generic Fault Tree used in Failure Analysis by Forensic Materials Engineers

A crucial aspect of forensic materials engineering is to avoid defining causes of failure in too binary a manner (i.e., narrowly framing the problem through questioning whether a particular component involved in the crime or accident was either defective or abused by the user). Ascertaining cause inevitably leads to identifying as many possible factors that could contribute to a failure through the generation of fault tree diagrams (see diagram at right). Following the generation of the possible causes, investigations are planned and evidence is collected to then determine which of the possible factors is/are probable in having caused the failure. Within probable causes, there are root causes which may consist of multiple factors: physical, human, and latent causes or factors.

During the litigation process each party involved, will on occasion, retain an expert forensic materials engineering witness to perform a failure analysis and compile a report. During such investigations, the parties are often present in the same location for the review of the physical evidence, and can be present for materials analyses. However, each party will often then independently perform their own observations of collected images and data and subsequently execute interpretations and analyses in preparation for depositions and/or court proceedings.

== In different materials ==
=== Metals and alloys ===
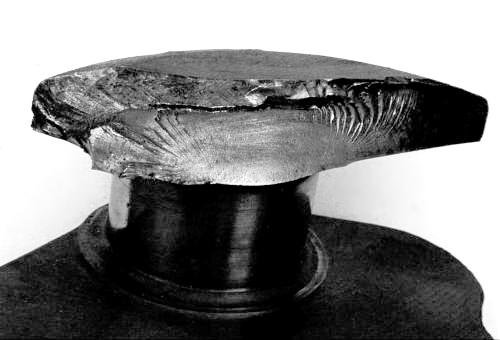
Crankshaft fatigue fracture

Metal surfaces can be analyzed in a number of ways, including by spectroscopy and energy-dispersive X-ray spectroscopy used during scanning electron microscopy. The nature and composition of the metal can normally be established by sectioning and polishing the bulk, and examining the flat section using optical microscopy after etching solutions have been used to provide contrast in the section between alloy constituents. Such solutions (often an acid) attack the surface preferentially, so isolating features or inclusions of one composition, enabling them to be seen much more clearly than in the polished but untreated surface. Metallography is a routine technique for examining the microstructure of metals, but can also be applied to ceramics, glasses and polymers. a scanning electron microscope (SEM) can often be critical in determining failures modes by examining fracture surfaces. The origin of a crack can be found and the way it grew assessed, to distinguish, for example, overload failure from fatigue. Often however, fatigue fractures are easy to distinguish from overload failures by the lack of ductility, and the existence of a fast crack growth region and the slow crack growth area on the fracture surface. Crankshaft fatigue for example is a common failure mode for engine parts. The example shows just two such zones, the slow crack at the base, the fast at the top.

=== Ceramics and glasses ===
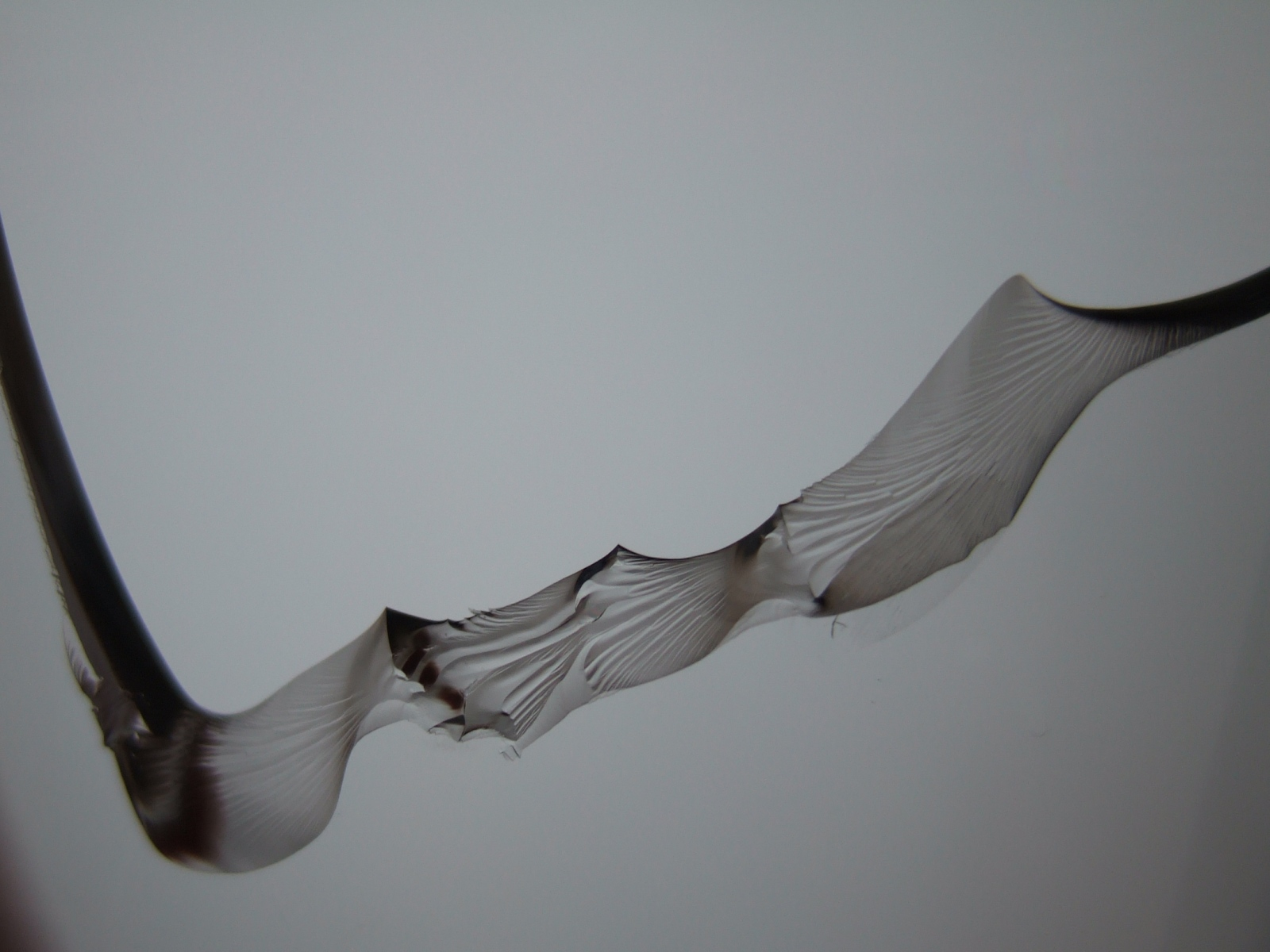
Brittle fracture in glass

Hard products like ceramic pottery and glass windscreens can be studied using the same SEM methods used for metals, especially an environmental scanning electron microscope (ESEM) conducted at low vacuum. Fracture surfaces are especially valuable sources of information because surface features like hachures can enable the origin or origins of the cracks to be found. Analysis of the surface features is carried out using fractography.

The position of the origin can then be matched with likely loads on the product to show how an accident occurred, for example. Inspection of bullet holes can often show the direction of travel and energy of the impact, and the way common glass products like bottles can be analysed to show whether deliberately or accidentally broken in a crime or accident. Defects such as foreign particles will often occur near or at the origin of the critical crack, and can be readily identified by ESEM.

=== Polymers and composites ===
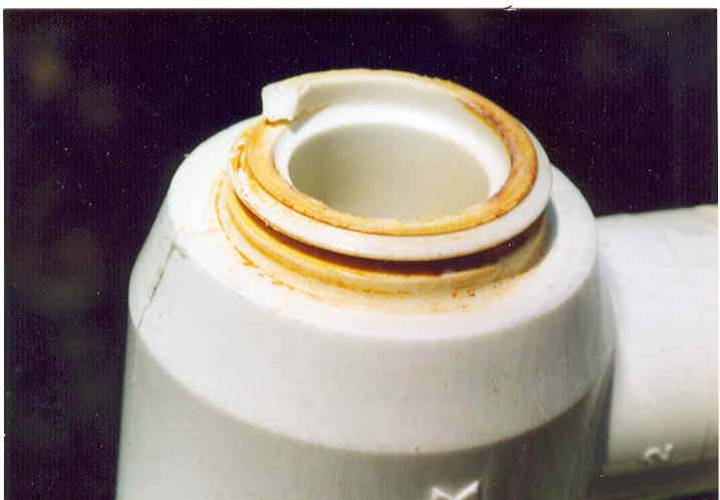
Chlorine attack of acetal resin plumbing joint

Thermoplastics, thermosets, and composites can be analyzed using FTIR and UV spectroscopy as well as NMR and ESEM. Failed samples can either be dissolved in a suitable solvent and examined directly (UV, IR and NMR spectroscopy) or as a thin film cast from solvent or cut using microtomy from the solid product. The slicing method is preferable since there are no complications from solvent absorption, and the integrity of the sample is partly preserved. Fractured products can be examined using fractography, an especially useful method for all fractured components using macrophotography and optical microscopy.

Although polymers usually possess quite different properties to metals and ceramics, they are just as susceptible to failure from mechanical overload, fatigue and stress corrosion cracking if products are poorly designed or manufactured. Many plastics are susceptible to attack by active chemicals like chlorine, present at low levels in potable water supplies, especially if the injection mouldings are faulty.

ESEM is especially useful for providing elemental analysis from viewed parts of the sample being investigated. It is effectively a technique of microanalysis and valuable for examination of trace evidence. On the other hand, colour rendition is absent, and there is no information provided about the way in which those elements are bonded to one another. Specimens will be exposed to a vacuum, so any volatiles may be removed, and surfaces may be contaminated by substances used to attach the sample to the mount.

=== Elastomers ===
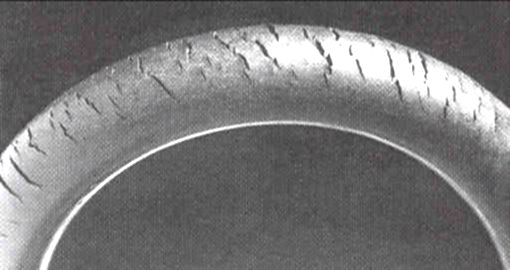
Ozone cracking in Natural rubber tubing

Rubber products are often safety-critical parts of machines, so that failure can often cause accidents or loss of function. Failed products can be examined with many of the generic polymer methods, although it is more difficult if the sample is vulcanized or cross-linked. Attenuated total reflectance infra-red spectroscopy is useful because the product is usually flexible so can be pressed against the selenium crystal used for analysis. Simple swelling tests can also help to identify the specific elastomer used in a product. Often the best technique is ESEM using the X-ray elemental analysis facility on the microscope.

Although the method only provides elemental analysis, it can provide clues as to the identity of the elastomer being examined. Thus the presence of substantial amounts of chlorine indicates polychloroprene while the presence of nitrogen indicates nitrile rubber. The method is also useful in confirming ozone cracking by the large amounts of oxygen present on cracked surfaces. Ozone attacks susceptible elastomers such as natural rubber, nitrile rubber and polybutadiene and associated copolymers. Such elastomers possess double bonds in their main chains, the group which is attacked during ozonolysis.

The problem occurs when small concentrations of ozone gas are present near to exposed elastomer surfaces, such as O-rings and diaphragm seals. The product must be in tension, but only very low strains are sufficient to cause degradation.

== See also ==
- Applied spectroscopy
- Brittleness
- Circumstantial evidence
- Forensic engineering
- Forensic polymer engineering
- Forensic science
- Fracture
- Fractography
- Fracture mechanics
- Ozone cracking
- Polymer degradation
- Skid mark
- Stress corrosion cracking
- Trace evidence
