= Mechanical overload =

Failure of a component

Mechanical overload is the failure or fracture of a product or component as a result of a single event. It is a common failure mode. The terms are used in forensic engineering and structural engineering when analysing product failure. Failure may occur because either the product is weaker than expected owing to a stress concentration, or the applied load is greater than expected and exceeds the normal tensile strength, shear strength or compressive strength of the product.

== See also ==
- Forensic engineering
- Stress analysis
- Structural engineering
