= Edmond Locard =

French forensic scientist

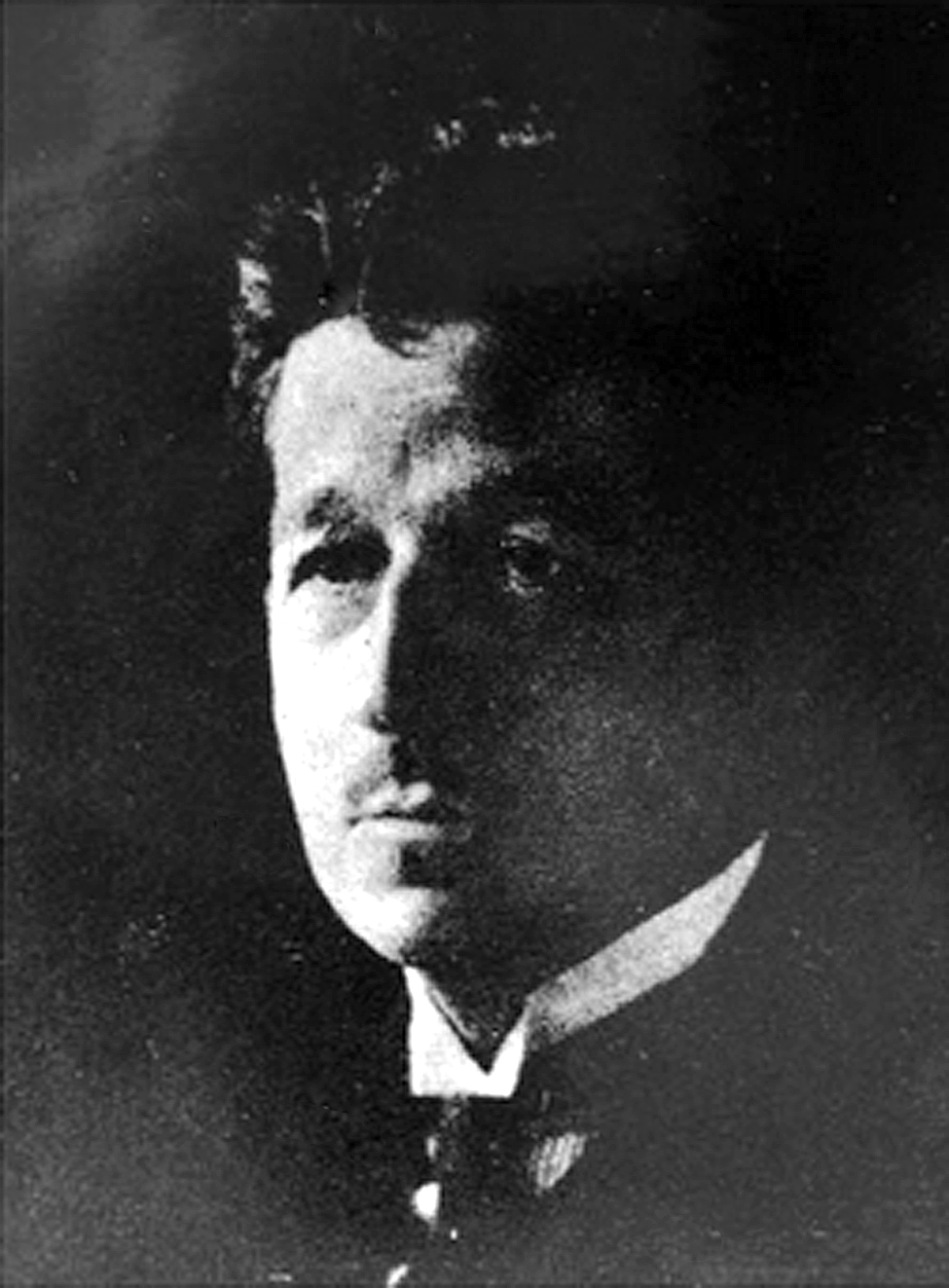
- Born: 13 December 1877; Saint-Chamond, Loire, French Third Republic
- Died: 4 May 1966 (aged 88); Lyon, France
- Citizenship: French
- Known for: First police laboratory, Locard's exchange principle, Sherlock Holmes of France
- Children: Denise Stagnara
- Scientific career
- Fields: Forensic science, Public health

Edmond Locard (13 December 1877 – 4 May 1966) was a French criminologist, the pioneer in forensic science who became known as the "Sherlock Holmes of France". He formulated the basic principle of forensic science: "Every contact leaves a trace". This became known as Locard's exchange principle.

== Biography ==
Locard was born in Saint-Chamond, France on December 13, 1877, although some records claim he was born in 1872. He studied medicine and law at Lyon, France, eventually becoming the assistant of Alexandre Lacassagne, a criminologist and professor. He held this post until 1910, when he began the foundation of his criminal laboratory. His lab, located in Lyon, was the first forensic lab in Europe.

In 1910, Locard succeeded in persuading the Police Department of Lyon to give him two attic rooms and two assistants, to start what became the first police forensic laboratory.

Locard's daughter Denise was born on November 18, 1917, in Paris.

Locard produced a monumental, seven-volume work, Traité de Criminalistique. He also was first to codify Galton points, fingerprint characteristics meant for identification.

Locard continued his research in Lyon until his death in 1966.

== Legacy ==
The young Georges Simenon, later to become a well-known detective writer, is known to have attended some Locard lectures in 1919 or 1920.

Locard is considered to be the father of modern forensic science. His Exchange Principle is the basis of all forensic work; the principle stipulates that when any two objects come into contact, there is always a transference of material between each object.

In November 2012, he was nominated to the French Forensic Science Hall of Fame of the Association Québécoise de Criminalistique.
