= Skid mark =

Mark left by any solid which moves against another

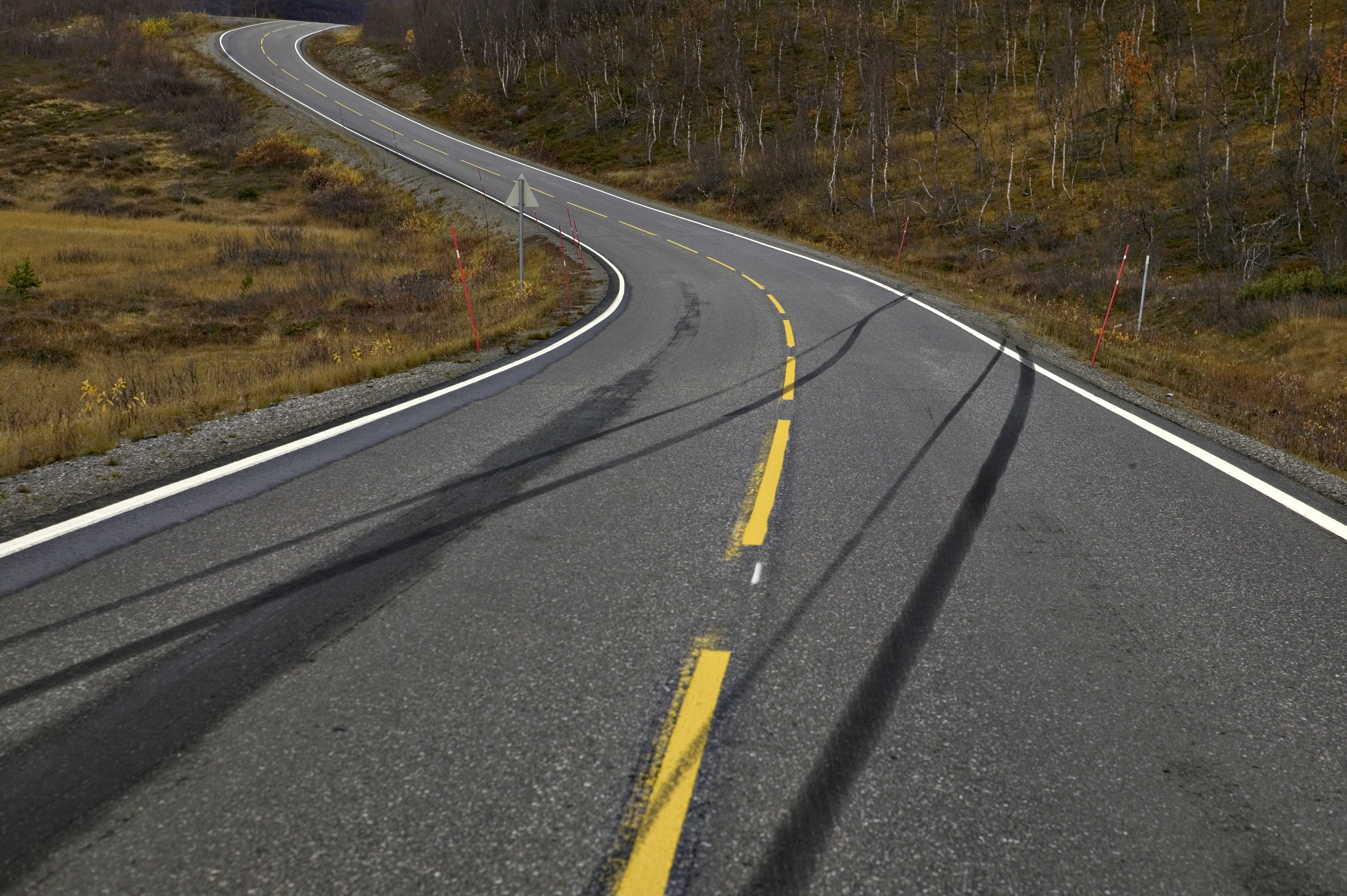
Skid marks on an asphalt road.

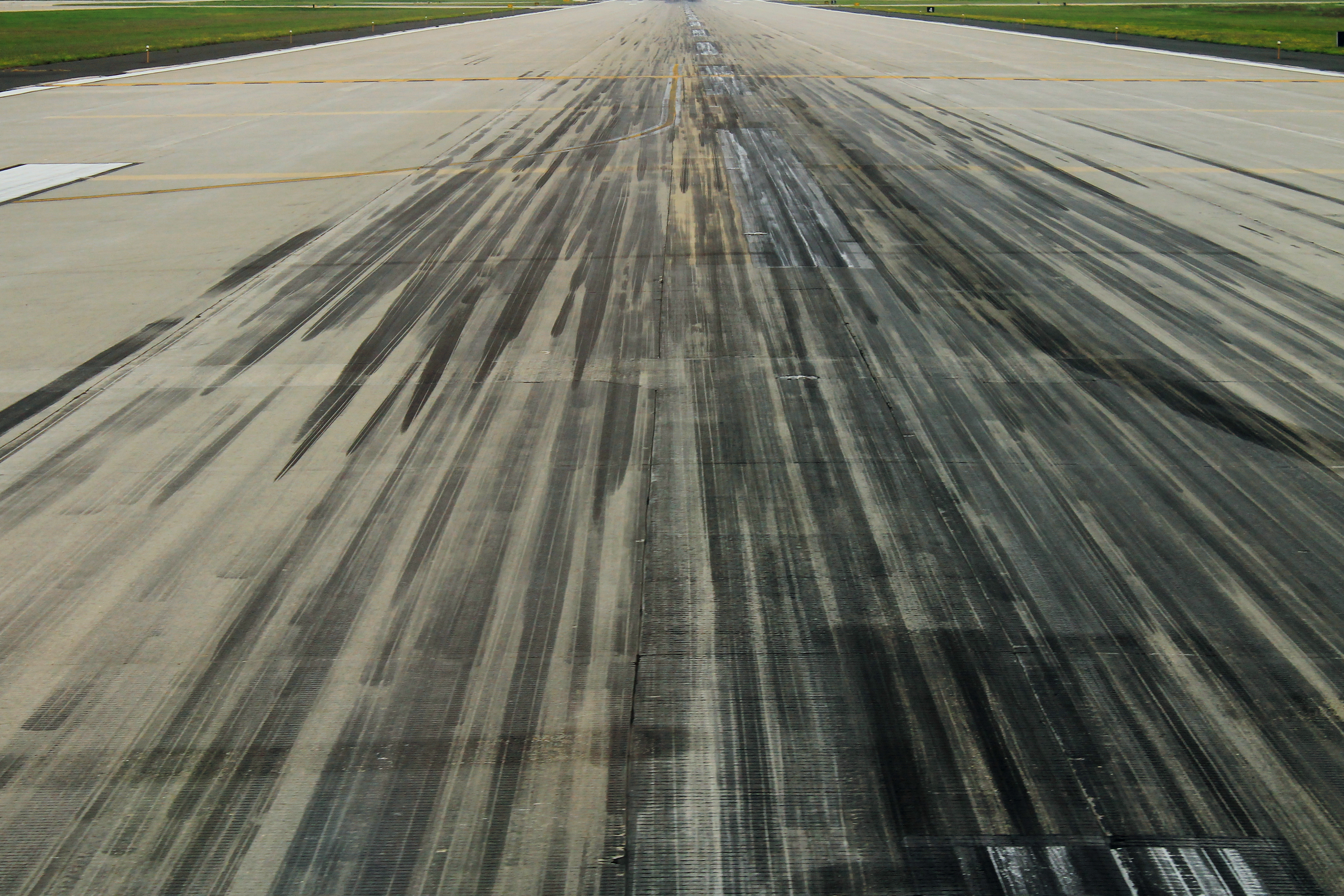
Skid marks from aircraft tires on a runway

A skid mark is an important aspect of trace evidence analysis in forensic science and forensic engineering. They are defined as the visible mark left by any solid which moves against another. Skid marks caused by tires on roads occur when a vehicle wheel stops rolling and slides or spins on the surface of the road. Skid marks can be analyzed to find the maximum and minimum vehicle speed prior to an impact or incident. Skidding can also occur on black ice or diesel deposits on the road and may not leave a mark at all.

== Characteristics ==
Skid marks are divided into "acceleration marks" created on acceleration, if the engine provides more power than the tire can transmit; "braking marks", if the brakes "lock up" and cause the tire to slide; or "yaw marks", if the tire slides sideways. Each skid mark has a characteristic appearance, and an experienced accident reconstructor or forensic engineer can often determine what the vehicle was doing by examining the marks left by the tire.

Different road surfaces produce different kinds of skid marks, sometimes also referred to as scuff marks or tire marks. On asphalt road surfaces, skid marks are usually the result of bituminous oils in the asphalt that are heated because of the friction of braking or accelerating and rise to the surface, leaving dark marks. This kind of mark on asphalt can last for months or even a year or two if they are particularly dark and the roadway is not well traveled. On other road surfaces, such as concrete, the marks result from the deposition of tire compounds onto the surface of the roadway. This kind of skid mark is typical of airport runways, which need to be periodically cleaned to remove deposited debris that reduce the frictional coefficient of the runway. The durability of these marks depends on a number of factors, including road use, tire compounds, weather, and frequency of road cleaning.

Braking marks will vary depending on whether the car uses ABS or not. If not, there will be two lines. The darker marks on the outside are from the front wheels, while the back tires leave thinner marks. This is because the force exerted makes the wheels take on a conical shape. If the car uses ABS, the marks will be much fainter as less heat is produced by the release-stop mechanism of ABS. Scuff marks may be visible however with ABS.

The term "scuff mark" is more often used for marks left by rubber shoes on a floor, mainly sneakers or trainers leaving black rubber marks on a gymnasium floor or basketball court when someone comes to a hard stop, or pivots in place, or a hockey puck leaving a rubber streak along the edge boards of the rink.

== Ladder accidents ==
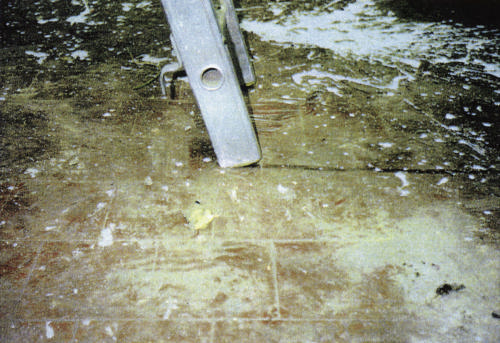
Skid mark from a faulty ladder

Skid marks can also be formed where a ladder suddenly slips and the user falls to the ground, especially if the ladder feet are faulty or absent. Loss of the rubber feet or foot causes the aluminum stile to make contact with the ground, and if a hard surface like concrete or tiling, a skid mark shows how and why the ladder slipped. Unless fixed to the wall upon which they are leaning, ladders can slip down easily, especially if the ladder is leaned at an angle lower than about 75 degrees. Such slip accidents tend to happen when the user is near the top of the ladder, increasing his or her chances of serious personal injury.

== Accident reconstruction ==
Such marks are important evidence for vehicular accident reconstruction, when their size and shape can reveal much about vehicle speed and forces of acceleration or deceleration. They are one form of trace evidence. They represent a form of contact evidence produced according to Locard's exchange principle. The length of the skid mark is usually closely related to the vehicle speed at the instant of braking, so measuring the marks yields an estimate of original speed. (Note: In most jurisdictions judicial notice shall be taken of the total stopping distance. The inverse function of the braking distance formula is: $V=\sqrt{ 2 \mu g d_{skid} }$ Applying the $\mu=0.7$ value that produced the baseline Code of Virginia § 46.2-880 Tables of speed and stopping distances, one simply obtains the same velocities that produced the stopping distances, $d_{skid}$, in the statute. The units must be correct to find a baseline velocity for a skid mark. In Metric (SI) units--speed in Km/h from distance in meters: $V \approx \sqrt{177.8 d_{skid} }$ In US Customary units--speed in MPH from distance in feet: $V \approx \sqrt{ 20.9 d_{skid} }$)

== Modern slang ==
In modern slang, the term "skid mark" means a fecal stain or smear on the back of one's underwear. It may also apply to a pet experiencing anal irritation and sliding (or scooting) across the floor to relieve the itching or obstruction, leaving a line of feces behind.

== See also ==
- Braking distance
- Forensic materials engineering
- Forensic polymer engineering
- Polymer degradation
