= Locard's exchange principle =

Principle in forensics and cyber security

In forensic science, Locard's principle holds that the perpetrator of a crime will bring something into the crime scene and leave with something from it, and that both can be used as forensic evidence. Edmond Locard (1877–1966) was a pioneer in forensic science who became known as the Sherlock Holmes of Lyon, France. He formulated the basic principle of forensic science as: "Every contact leaves a trace". It is generally understood as "with contact between two items, there will be an exchange." Paul L. Kirk expressed the principle as follows:

Wherever he steps, whatever he touches, whatever he leaves, even unconsciously, will serve as a silent witness against him. Not only his fingerprints or his footprints, but his hair, the fibres from his clothes, the glass he breaks, the tool mark he leaves, the paint he scratches, the blood or semen he deposits or collects. All of these and more, bear mute witness against him. This is evidence that does not forget. It is not confused by the excitement of the moment. It is not absent because human witnesses are. It is factual evidence. Physical evidence cannot be wrong, it cannot perjure itself, it cannot be wholly absent. Only human failure to find it, study and understand it, can diminish its value.

Fragmentary or trace evidence is any type of material left at (or taken from) a crime scene, or the result of contact between two surfaces, such as shoes and the floor covering or soil, or fibres from where someone sat on an upholstered chair.

When a crime is committed, fragmentary (or trace) evidence needs to be collected from the scene. A team of specialised police technicians goes to the scene of the crime and seals it off. They record video and take photographs of the crime scene, victim/s (if there are any) and items of evidence. If necessary, they undertake ballistics examinations. They check for foot, shoe, and tire mark impressions, plus hair as well as examine any vehicles and check for fingerprints – whole or partial.

== Application in information security ==
Locard's Principle also holds in computer forensics, where committing cyber crime will result in a digital trace being left behind.

== In popular culture ==
In season 1, episode 16 of CSI: Crime Scene Investigation, Gil Grissom names and describes Locard's principle to assure the team that any case can be solved.

In season 1, episode 3 of Balthazar, Raphaël Balthazar used Locard's principle to reveal the hideout of a killer.

In season 3, episode 15 of Father Brown, Inspector Sullivan and Frank Albert discuss this principle, which plays into the investigation.

In season 1, episode 10 of Sister Boniface Mysteries, the title character imagines Locard appearing to expound on his principle.

In season 2, episode 21 of Law & Order: Special Victims Unit, Locard's principle is mentioned and used in the investigation into a serial killer.

In season 9, episode 5 of Death in Paradise, DI Neville Parker uses Locard's principle to solve a murder disguised as a suicide.

In season 4, episode 17 of Crossing Jordan, Locard's principle is used, suggesting testing a suspect's personal belongings stored in prison.

The April Henry teen mystery series Point Last Seen regularly mentions Locard's principle, particularly through leading character Ruby, who studies forensics and true crime for a future career as a cop. The principle is crucial when explaining how her friend Nick was wrongfully suspected of murder in the second novel, "Blood Will Tell".

In the 2021 Malayalam film Cold Case (film) , the main character ACP M. Sathyajith IPS references Locard's Principle, which also serves as a central theme in the movie's investigative narrative.
