= Forensic tire tread evidence =

Analysis of tire treads at crime scenes

Forensic tire tread evidence records and analyzes impressions of vehicle tire treads for use in legal proceedings to help place a suspect at a crime scene. Every tire will show different amounts of tread wear, and different amounts of damage in the form of tiny cuts, nicks, and scratches. These unique characteristics will also show on the impression left by the tire.

== History ==
This forensic technique was first invented in 1930 by David Chapman, a researcher affiliated with the Sheriff's Office in Los Angeles, California, in the United States. A try-square would be placed on the ground around the tire mark to measure it. It was difficult to identify the tire just from a photograph, so they used calculations based on the camera position and other data to identify it. With the calculations, they were able to find size, make, car type, load, mileage, and where the car was driven. From the 1930s to the 1960s, FBI analysts expanded their analysis from 1800 patterns of tire tread to include dimensions and characteristics.

== Prints ==
A visible print is something that can be seen with the naked eye. Examples would be muddy tracks on the ground or tire imprints in the snow.

A plastic print is an impression left on a soft surface like mud or sand. These can be 2-dimensional or 3-dimensional.

A latent print is not visible to the naked eye without manipulation. They are usually found on surfaces that are flat, like a sidewalk or a driveway. Static is used to make a print. Chemicals, powders, or alternative light are used to see a print already on the ground.

== Ways to collect samples ==
Photography is a simple way to collect visible prints.

Casting is the most common way to collect samples. This is when powdered stone material is mixed with water and poured into the impression to create a three-dimensional cast.

A thick coating of adhesive can be used on smooth, non-delicate surfaces. Rubber with a low-adhesive gelatin layer is what is used on rougher surfaces.

An Electrostatic dust-print lifting device is used for prints that are dry or dusty. It charges the particles and attaches them to a lifting film like a gelatin lifter.

Chemicals, powders, or alternative light can also be used to enhance prints that have already been collected.

Samples collected are compared side by side to prints from manufacturers to tell which marks were created by the crime and which are in the original design.
