= Forensic engineering =

Investigation of failures associated with legal intervention

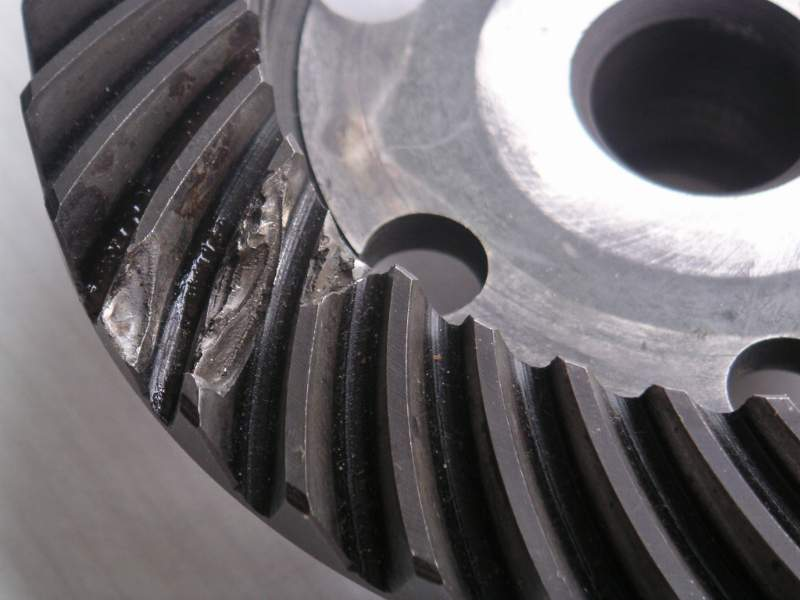
Broken gear teeth on a piece of machinery

Forensic engineering has been defined as "the investigation of failures—ranging from serviceability to catastrophic—which may lead to legal activity, including both civil and criminal". The forensic engineering field is very broad in terms of the many disciplines that it covers, investigations that use forensic engineering are case of environmental damages to structures, system failures of machines, explosions, electrical, fire point of origin, vehicle failures and many more.

It includes the investigation of materials, products, structures or components that fail or do not operate or function as intended, causing personal injury, damage to property or economic loss. The consequences of failure may give rise to action under either criminal or civil law including but not limited to health and safety legislation, the laws of contract and/or product liability and the laws of tort. The field also deals with retracing processes and procedures leading to accidents in operation of vehicles or machinery. Generally, the purpose of a forensic engineering investigation is to locate cause or causes of failure with a view to improve performance or life of a component, or to assist a court in determining the facts of an accident. It can also involve investigation of intellectual property claims, especially patents. In the US, forensic engineers require a professional engineering license from each state.

== History ==
As the field of engineering has evolved over time, so has the field of forensic engineering. Early examples include investigation of bridge failures such as the Tay rail bridge disaster of 1879 and the Dee bridge disaster of 1847. Many early rail accidents prompted the invention of tensile testing of samples and fractography of failed components.

== Investigation ==
Vital to the field of forensic engineering is the process of investigating and collecting data related to the: materials, products, structures or components that failed. This involves: inspections, collecting evidence, measurements, developing models, obtaining exemplar products, and performing experiments. Often, testing and measurements are conducted in an Independent testing laboratory or other reputable unbiased laboratory.

When investigating a case a forensic engineer will follow a series of standard steps of their investigation process. First thing is when the forensic engineer arrives to the scene is to establish safety, they make sure that all the hazards have been dealt with an are safe to handle and be analyzed. The next step would be to do an initial incident appraisal, this is done before any analysis is done and they take a quick observation of what the solution is at hand. The third step in the investigative process is to plan how to the investigation will go and would resources they will need to obtain to do the analysis accurately. Next would be establishing the terms of reverence, this is when the forensic engineer will consult with the client on what they want done in the investigation. The next step is to create the investigative team, once there is plan on how to investigate they will make a team of the experts in the given field needed to conduct the analysis. lastly would be to start the investigation, and this is where they conduct their analysis.

== Analysis ==
This picture shows the mechanics of the spectroscopy machine

There are two main types of analysis done in forensic engineering: root cause analysis and failure analysis. Root cause analysis is defined as looking at the system as a whole and what led to the system failing, and is done with large-scale object, for example, a building collapse. Failure analysis is defined as the analysis of one part in the system that failed to operate. An example of this would be a car failure causing an accident. These two types of analysis are the initial assessments done when forensic engineering investigators start their investigation.

Failure mode and effects analysis (FMEA) and fault tree analysis methods also examine product or process failure in a structured and systematic way, in the general context of safety engineering. However, all such techniques rely on accurate reporting of failure rates and precise ID, of the failure modes involved.

There is some common ground between forensic science and forensic engineering, such as scene of crime and scene of accident analysis, integrity of the evidence, and court appearances. Both disciplines make extensive use of optical and scanning electron microscopes, for example. They also share common use of spectroscopy (infrared, ultraviolet, and nuclear magnetic resonance) to examine critical evidence. Radiography using X-rays (such as X-ray computed tomography), or neutrons is also very useful in examining thick products for their internal defects before destructive examination is attempted. Often, however, a simple hand lens may reveal the cause of a particular problem.

Trace evidence is sometimes an important factor in reconstructing the sequence of events in an accident. For example, tire burn marks on a road surface can enable vehicle speeds to be estimated, when the brakes were applied and so on. Ladder feet often leave a trace of movement of the ladder during a slip and may show how the accident occurred. When a product fails for no obvious reason, SEM and Energy-dispersive X-ray spectroscopy (EDX) performed in the microscope can reveal the presence of aggressive chemicals that have left traces on the fracture or adjacent surfaces. Thus an acetal resin water pipe joint suddenly failed and caused substantial damages to a building in which it was situated. Analysis of the joint showed traces of chlorine, indicating a stress corrosion cracking failure mode. The failed fuel pipe junction mentioned above showed traces of sulfur on the fracture surface from the sulfuric acid, which had initiated the crack.

Extracting physical evidence from digital photography is a major technique used in forensic accident reconstruction. Camera matching, photogrammetry, and photo rectification techniques are used to create three-dimensional and top-down views from the two-dimensional photos typically taken at an accident scene. Overlooked or undocumented evidence for accident reconstruction can be retrieved and quantified as long as photographs of such evidence are available. By using photographs of the accident scene including the vehicle, "lost" evidence can be recovered and accurately determined.

Forensic materials engineering involves methods applied to specific materials, such as metals, glasses, ceramics, composites and polymers.

== Organizations ==
The National Academy of Forensic Engineers (NAFE) was founded in 1982 by Marvin M. Specter, P.E., L.S.; Paul E. Pritzker, P.E., and William A. Cox Jr., P.E. to identify and bring together professional engineers having qualifications and expertise as practicing forensic engineers to further their continuing education and promote high standards of professional ethics and excellence of practice. It seeks to improve the practice, elevate the standards, and advance the cause of forensic engineering. Full membership in the academy is limited to Registered Professional Engineers who are also members of the National Society of Professional Engineers (NSPE). They must also be members in an acceptable grade of a recognized major technical engineering society. NAFE also offers Affiliate grades of membership to those who do not yet qualify for Member grade. Full members are board-certified through the Council of Engineering and Scientific Specialty Boards and earn the title "Diplomate of Forensic Engineering", or "DFE". This is typically used after their designation as Profesional Engineer.

== Examples ==
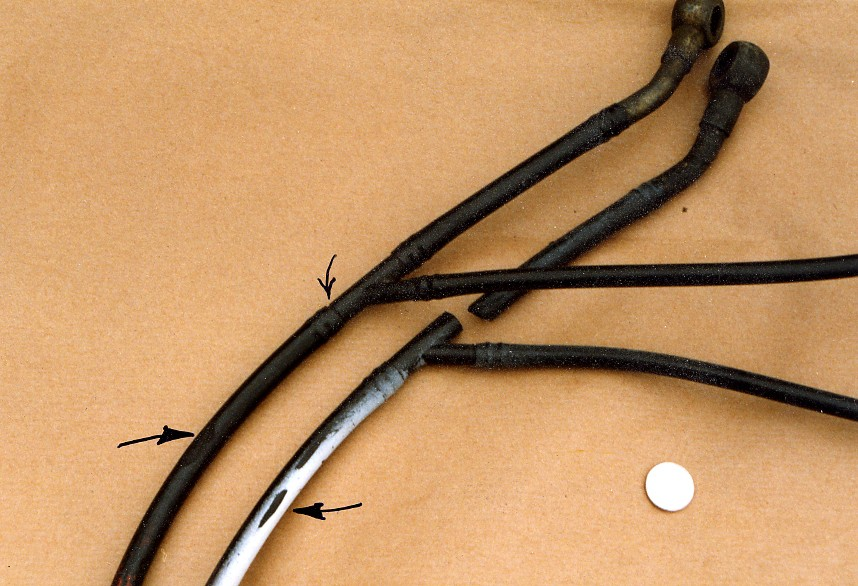
Failed fuel pipe at right from a road traffic accident.

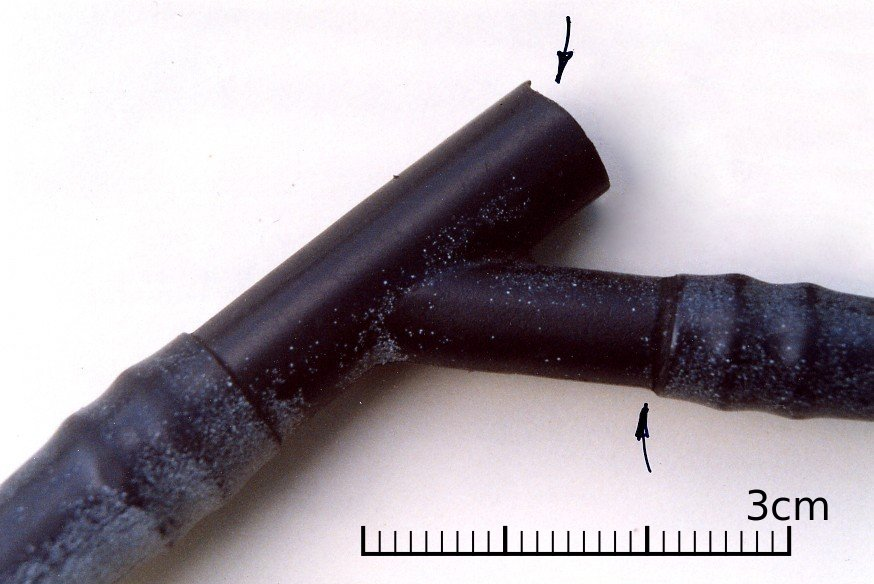
Close-up of the broken fuel pipe from a road traffic accident.

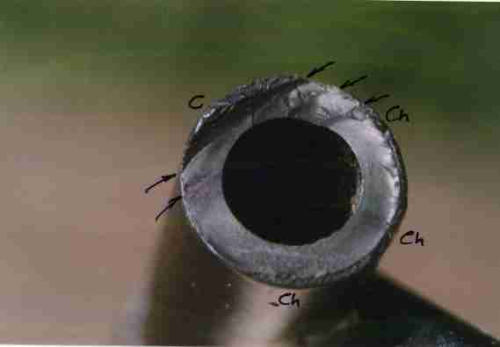
Close-up of the broken fuel pipe.

The broken fuel pipe shown at left caused a serious accident when diesel fuel poured out from a van onto the road. A following car skidded and the driver was seriously injured when she collided with an oncoming lorry. Scanning electron microscopy (SEM) showed that the nylon connector had fractured by stress corrosion cracking (SCC) due to a small leak of battery acid. Nylon is susceptible to hydrolysis when in contact with sulfuric acid, and only a small leak of acid would have sufficed to start a brittle crack in the injection moulded nylon 6,6 connector by SCC. The crack took about 7 days to grow across the diameter of the tube. The fracture surface showed a mainly brittle surface with striations indicating progressive growth of the crack across the diameter of the pipe. Once the crack had penetrated the inner bore, fuel started leaking onto the road.

The nylon 6,6 had been attacked by the following reaction, which was catalyzed by the acid:

Diesel fuel is especially hazardous on road surfaces because it forms a thin, oily film that cannot be easily seen by drivers. It is much like black ice in its slipperiness, so skids are common when diesel leaks occur. The insurers of the van driver admitted liability and the injured driver was compensated.

== Applications ==
Most manufacturing models will have a forensic component that monitors early failures to improve quality or efficiencies. Insurance companies use forensic engineers to prove liability or nonliability. Most engineering disasters (structural failures such as bridge and building collapses) are subject to forensic investigation by engineers experienced in forensic methods of investigation. Rail crashes, aviation accidents, and some automobile accidents are investigated by forensic engineers in particular where component failure is suspected. Furthermore, appliances, consumer products, medical devices, structures, industrial machinery, and even simple hand tools such as hammers or chisels can warrant investigations upon incidents causing injury or property damages. The failure of medical devices is often safety-critical to the user, so reporting failures and analysing them is particularly important. The environment of the body is complex, and implants must both survive this environment, and not leach potentially toxic impurities. Problems have been reported with breast implants, heart valves, and catheters, for example.

Failures that occur early in the life of a new product are vital information for the manufacturer to improve the product. New product development aims to eliminate defects by testing in the factory before launch, but some may occur during its early life. Testing products to simulate their behavior in the external environment is a difficult skill, and may involve accelerated life testing for example. The worst kind of defect to occur after launch is a safety-critical defect, a defect that can endanger life or limb. Their discovery usually leads to a product recall or even complete withdrawal of the product from the market. Product defects often follow the bathtub curve, with high initial failures, a lower rate during regular life, followed by another rise due to wear-out. National standards, such as those of ASTM and the British Standards Institute, and International Standards can help the designer in increasing product integrity.

== Historic examples ==
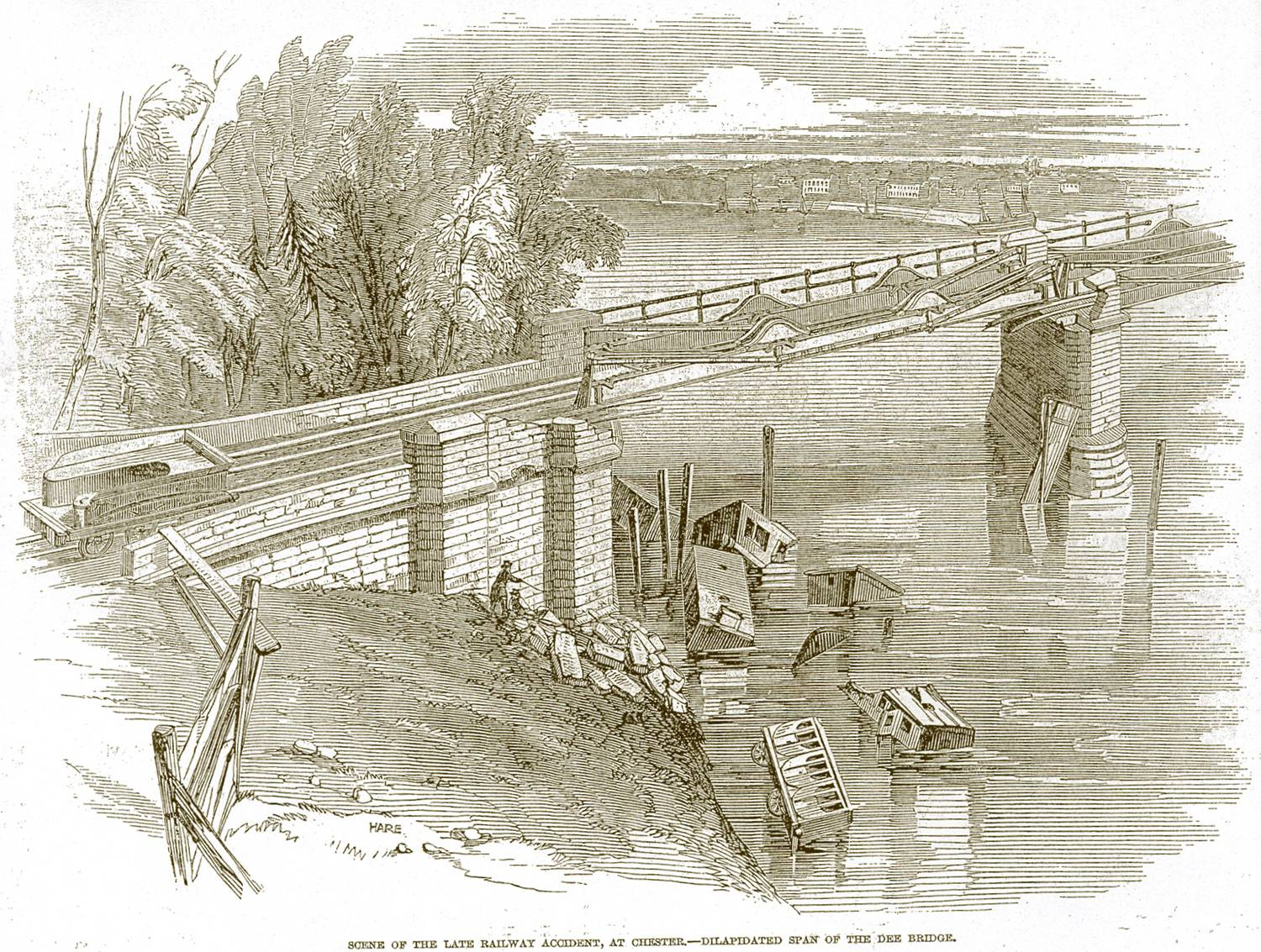
Dee bridge disaster.

There are many examples of forensic methods used to investigate accidents and disasters, one of the earliest in the modern period being the fall of the Dee bridge at Chester, England. It was built using cast iron girders, each of which was made of three very large castings dovetailed together. Each girder was strengthened by wrought iron bars along the length. It was finished in September 1846, and opened for local traffic after approval by the first Railway Inspector, General Charles Pasley. However, on 24 May 1847, a local train to Ruabon fell through the bridge. The accident resulted in five deaths (three passengers, the train guard, and the locomotive fireman) and nine serious injuries. The bridge had been designed by Robert Stephenson, and he was accused of negligence by a local inquest.

Although strong in compression, cast iron was known to be brittle in tension or bending. On the day of the accident, the bridge deck was covered with track ballast to prevent the oak beams supporting the track from catching fire, imposing a heavy extra load on the girders supporting the bridge and probably exacerbating the accident. Stephenson took this precaution because of a recent fire on the Great Western Railway at Uxbridge, London, where Isambard Kingdom Brunel's bridge caught fire and collapsed.

One of the first major inquiries conducted by the newly formed Railway Inspectorate was conducted by Captain Simmons of the Royal Engineers, and his report suggested that repeated flexing of the girder weakened it substantially. He examined the broken parts of the main girder, and confirmed that the girder had broken in two places, the first break occurring at the center. He tested the remaining girders by driving a locomotive across them, and found that they deflected by several inches under the moving load. He concluded that the design was flawed, and that the wrought iron trusses fixed to the girders did not reinforce the girders at all, which was a conclusion also reached by the jury at the inquest. Stephenson's design had depended on the wrought iron trusses to strengthen the final structures, but they were anchored on the cast iron girders themselves, and so deformed with any load on the bridge. Others (especially Stephenson) argued that the train had derailed and hit the girder, the impact force causing it to fracture. However, eyewitnesses said that they saw the girder break first, and that the locomotive and tender were still on the track at the far side of the bridge.

== Publications ==
Product failures are not widely published in the academic literature or trade literature, partly because companies do not want to advertise their problems. However, it then denies others the opportunity to improve product design so as to prevent further accidents.

The journal Engineering Failure Analysis (ISSN 1873-1961), published in affiliation with the European Structural Integrity Society, publishes case studies of a wide range of different products, failing under different circumstances.

A publication dealing with failures of buildings, bridges, and other structures, is the Journal of Performance of Constructed Facilities, which is published by the American Society of Civil Engineers, under the umbrella of its Technical Council on Forensic Engineering.

The Journal of the National Academy of Forensic Engineers is a peer-reviewed open access journal that provides a multi-disciplinary examination of the forensic engineering field. Submission is open to NAFE members and the journal's peer review process includes in-person presentation for live feedback prior to a single-blind technical peer review.

== See also ==
- Failure mode and effects analysis
- Traffic collision – Incident when a vehicle collides with another object
- Catastrophic failure – Sudden and total failure from which recovery is impossible
- Evidence packaging – Specialized packaging for physical evidence
- Failure analysis – Process of collecting and analyzing data to determine the cause of a failure
- Forensic chemistry – Forensic application of the study of chemistry
- Forensic electrical engineering
- Forensic identification – Legal identification of specific objects and materials
- Forensic materials engineering – Branch of forensic engineering
- Forensic photography – Art of producing an accurate reproduction of a crime scene
- Forensic polymer engineering – Study of failure in polymeric products
- Forensic science – Application of science to law and investigation
- Fractography – Study of the fracture surfaces of materials
- Stress–strain analysis – Mathematical analysis of stresses in solids
- Structural analysis – Calculation of structural loads
- Structural integrity and failure – Ability of a structure to support a designed structural load without breaking
- Trace evidence – Type of evidence of physical contact
- Traffic collision reconstruction – Process for investigating vehicle collisions
