= American Board of Forensic Document Examiners =

American Board of Forensic Document Examiners, Inc.
- Abbreviation: ABFDE
- Formation: 1977
- Purpose: To establish, enhance, and maintain standards of qualification and to certify, as qualified forensic document examination specialists, those voluntary applicants who comply with the requirements of the ABFDE
- Headquarters: Houston, Texas
- Location: Admin: 7887 San Felipe, Suite 122, Houston, Texas 77063
- Region served: USA, Canada, Mexico
- Members: 125 Diplomates from private, federal, state and local government agencies (as of 21 December 2010)
- Official language: English
- President: Meg O'Brien
- Main organ: Executive Committee
- Website: http://www.abfde.org/
- Remarks: Accredited by The FSAB, Inc

The American Board of Forensic Document Examiners, Inc. (ABFDE), is a non-profit organization which provides third-party certification of professional forensic document examiners (FDEs) from Canada, Australia, New Zealand, and the United States of America, and other countries if approved by the board of directors. Sponsored by the American Academy of Forensic Sciences at its inception in 1977, the ABFDE is the largest certifying body of forensic document examiners in North America. Individuals holding a valid certificate of qualification issued by the ABFDE use the designation "Diplomate of the American Board of Forensic Document Examiners", often abbreviated as D-ABFDE.

== Objectives ==
The board states its objectives as "to establish, enhance, and maintain standards of qualification for those who practice forensic document examination and to certify, as qualified specialists, those voluntary applicants who comply with the requirements of the Board." The ABFDE is intended to assist the judicial system and the public by providing "a practical and equitable system for readily identifying those persons professing to be specialists in forensic document examination who possess the requisite qualifications and competence". Courts must assess the credibility of the document examiner as an expert witness and to do this they will often rely upon the examiner's reputation in the profession, his or her affiliations with credible professional organizations or societies as well as any third-party certifications they may possess.

The ABFDE is sponsored by the American Society of Questioned Document Examiners (ASQDE), Canadian Society of Forensic Science (CSFS), the Southeastern Association of Forensic Document Examiners (SAFDE), and the Southwestern Association of Forensic Document Examiners (SWAFDE) and further recognized by the American Academy of Forensic Sciences (AAFS), the International Association for Identification (IAI) and the Mid-Atlantic Association of Forensic Scientists (MAAFS).

== History ==
The ABFDE is incorporated as a non-profit organization in the District of Columbia and was formed in 1977 under a grant from the U.S. Department of Justice. The ABFDE is accredited with the Forensic Specialties Accreditation Board, Inc. (FSAB), to carry out certification of FDEs. To date, there is no federal licensing involved in the discipline in North America. However, courts have recognized the ABFDE as reputable in the following cases, in denying a motion that claimed that handwriting comparisons were unreliable:

- People v. Tidwell, 706 P.2d 438 (1985).
- State v. Livanos, 725 P.2d 505 (1986).
- Buoni v. Ferres Industries, 219 N.J. Super. 96 (1987).
- US v. Buck, SDNY Lexis 9913 (1987).
- US v. Bourgeois, 950 F.2nd 980 (1992).

John J. Harris sat as the inaugural chairman in 1977, and in the following year, the Committee of Certification was created.

As of 23 February 2024, 82 Diplomates are listed as being certified examiners working in private, federal, state and local government laboratories.

Since 2007, the ABFDE has been recognized as a ‘Conformity Assessment Body’ (CAB) with the Forensic Specialties Accreditation Board, Inc. with re-accreditation in 2012, 2017, and 2022.

== Requirements to apply ==
An applicant to the ABFDE for certification must meet the following requirements:

1. must be of good moral character, high integrity and good repute; and possess high ethical and professional standing
2. must be a permanent resident of the United States of America, Canada, Australia, New Zealand, and other such places as the Board of Directors may, from time to time, authorize and direct.
3. must possess a bachelor's degree (or higher) from an accredited academic institution, or equivalent
4. must have successfully completed a full-time training program that meets the following basic requirements as found in the SWGDOC Standard for Minimum Training Requirements for Forensic Document Examiners:
  - Full-time training
  - Minimum of 24 months under the supervision of a principal trainer (and a maximum period not exceed four years)
  - Covering all topics addressed in the ABFDE Study Guide
  - Training from a principal trainer who also meets these requirements with a minimum of five years of full-time experience following his/her training as a forensic document examiner.
5. must provide three references from FDEs certified or recognized by the Board
6. must be actively engaged in the full-time practise of forensic document examination and
7. must demonstrate a record of appropriate professional activity in forensic document examination, in accordance with the following definitions:
  - Forensic document examination is the practice of the application of document examination to the purposes of the law
  - Forensic document examination relates to the examination of handwriting, typewriting, the authenticity of signatures, alterations in documents, the significance of inks and papers, photocopying processes, printing processes, writing instruments, sequence of writing, and other elements of a document relative to its authenticity or spuriousness, and
  - Forensic document examination does not involve the employment of calligraphic or engrossing skills, nor does it involve a study of handwriting in an attempt to create a personality profile or otherwise analyze or judge the writer's personality or character.

In addition to meeting the basic requirements listed above, an applicant must also pass comprehensive written, practical and oral examinations that test the wide range of problems encountered in document examination.

== Ongoing requirements for certification ==
Certificates issued by the ABFDE are valid for five years, and can be renewed. During that five-year renewal period, the diplomate must be actively engaged in forensic document examination work either as an examiner, as a supervisor of other forensic document examiners or as a trainer of forensic document examiners. Additionally, the diplomate applying for recertification must earn at least 40 continuing education credits to demonstrate that s/he has maintained currency in the profession. Credits are awarded for a variety of related activities, such as attendance and participation at ABFDE approved forensic meeting and programs, and publication of articles in journals approved by the board.
