= Gail Anderson (entomologist) =

Canadian forensic entomologist

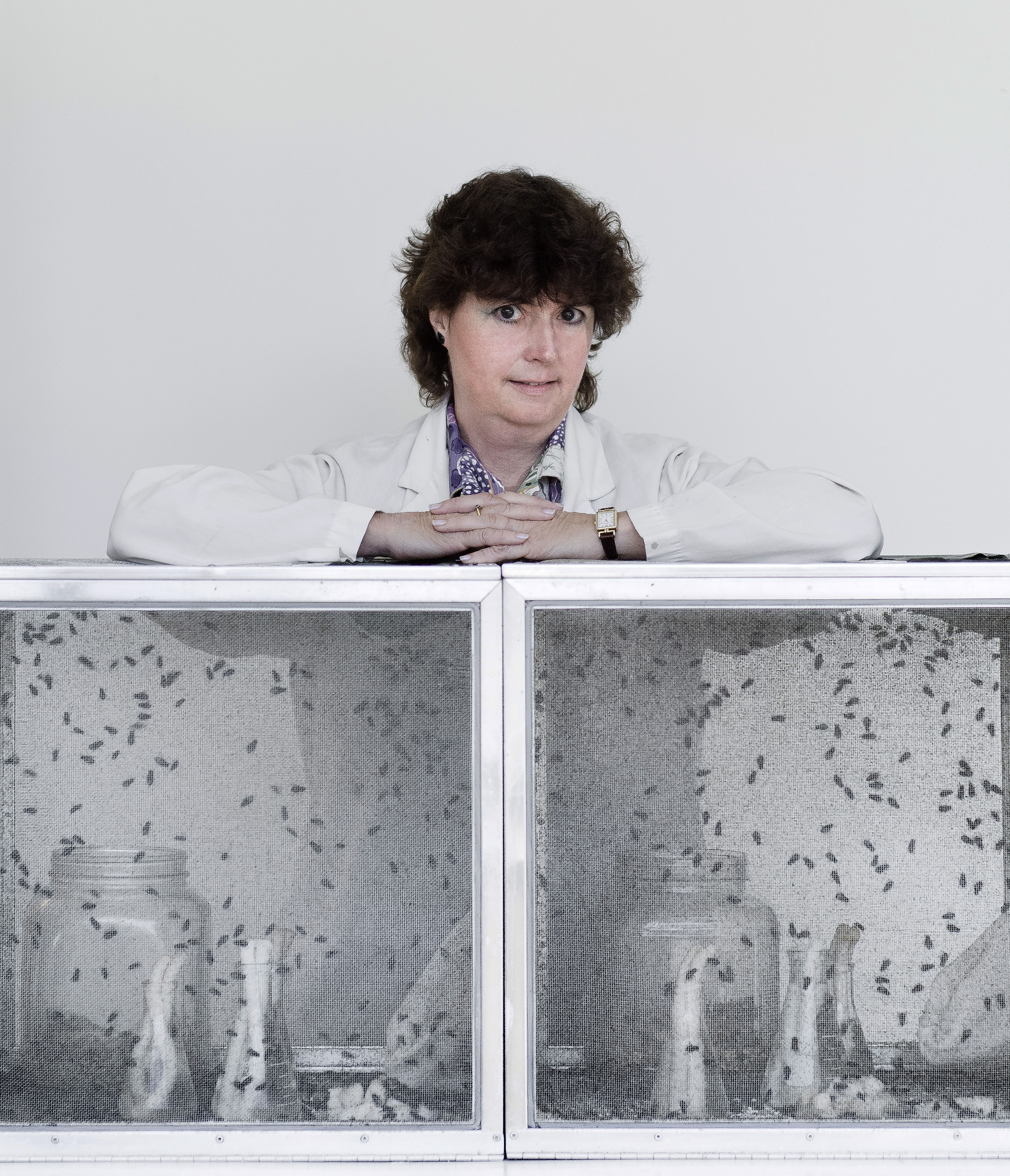
- Anderson in 2009
- Education: Simon Fraser University, Manchester University
- Scientific career
- Fields: Forensic entomology, forensic science
- Thesis: The Diagnosis and Treatment of Culicoides Hypersensitivity in Horses in British Columbia (1992)

Gail S. Anderson is a forensic entomologist, academic, and associate director of the School of Criminology at Simon Fraser University, Burnaby, British Columbia, Canada. She is an instructor at the Canadian Police College, a fellow of the American Academy of Forensic Sciences and the Canadian Society of Forensic Science, as well as a member of the Canadian Identification Society and the International Association for Identification.

Originally a high school science technician, Anderson went on to become Canada's first full-time forensic entomologist in 1992. In 2001, Time magazine named Anderson one of North America's leading innovators in the field of law enforcement. Anderson's research has helped to solve murders, catch poachers, and serve as a resource for archaeologists. Her expert witness testimony has been used in many homicides including the trial of Robert Pickton.

== Research ==
Anderson is the director of the Forensic Entomology Laboratory at Simon Fraser University. The laboratory was established in 1999 and was the first lab in North America to focus specifically on solving crimes through the study of insect biology. She has gone on to create the world's first database of flesh eating insects to be used in murder investigations.

== Education ==
Anderson received her undergraduate degree (B.Sc. honours zoology) from Manchester University, and her Master of Pest Management (MPM) and PhD from Simon Fraser University. Initially Anderson intended to work in the medical veterinary field using entomology, however, when her supervisor at Simon Fraser University had to look for someone to head up forensic entomology in the department after a colleague quit, Anderson decided to take on the role.

== Awards and honours ==
In 2026, Anderson received the Order of BC. Anderson received the Derome Award (2001), the top award of the Canadian Society of Forensic Science, and the YWCA Women of Distinction Award for Science and Technology (1999).

== Selected publications ==
- Anderson, G. S. (2011). "Comparison of decomposition rates and faunal colonization of carrion in indoor and outdoor environments". Journal of Forensic Sciences, 56 (1), 136–142. doi:10.1111/j.1556-4029.2010.01539.x
- Anderson, G. (2000). "Minimum and maximum development rates of some forensically important Calliphoridae (Diptera)". Journal of Forensic Sciences, 45 (4), 824–832.
- Anderson, G., Belton, P., & Kleider, N. (1988). "The hypersensitivity of horses to Culicoides bites in British-Columbia". Canadian Veterinary Journal, 29 (9), 718–723.
- Anderson, G., Belton, P., & Kleider, N. (1993). "Hypersensitivity of horses in British-Columbia to extracts of native and exotic species of Culicoides (Diptera, Ceratopogonidae)". Journal of Medical Entomology, 30 (4), 657–663.
- Anderson, G., & Hobischak, N. (2004). "Decomposition of carrion in the marine environment in British Columbia, Canada". International Journal of Legal Medicine, 118 (4), 206–209. doi:10.1007/s00414-004-0447-2
- Anderson, G., & VanLaerhoven, S. (1996). "Initial studies on insect succession on carrion in southwestern British Columbia". Journal of Forensic Sciences, 41 (4), 617–625.
- Hobischak, N., & Anderson, G. (2002). "Time of submergence using aquatic invertebrate succession and decompositional changes". Journal of Forensic Sciences, 47 (1), 142–151.
- Sharanowski, B. J., Walker, E. G., & Anderson, G. S. (2008). "Insect succession and decomposition patterns on shaded and sunlit carrion in Saskatchewan in three different seasons". Forensic Science International, 179 (2-3), 219–240. doi:10.1016/j.forsciint.2008.05.019
- Sperling, F., Anderson, G., & Hickey, D. (1994). "A DNA-based approach to the identification of insect species used for postmortem interval estimation". Journal of Forensic Sciences, 39 (2), 418–427.
- VanLaerhoven, S., & Anderson, G. (1999). "Insect succession on buried carrion in two biogeoclimatic zones of British Columbia". Journal of Forensic Sciences, 44 (1), 32–43.

== Sources ==
- "Gail S. Anderson: Burnaby Mountain Endowed Professor". Faculty page at Simon Fraser University
