= Alexandre Beaudoin =

Canadian forensic scientist (born 1978)

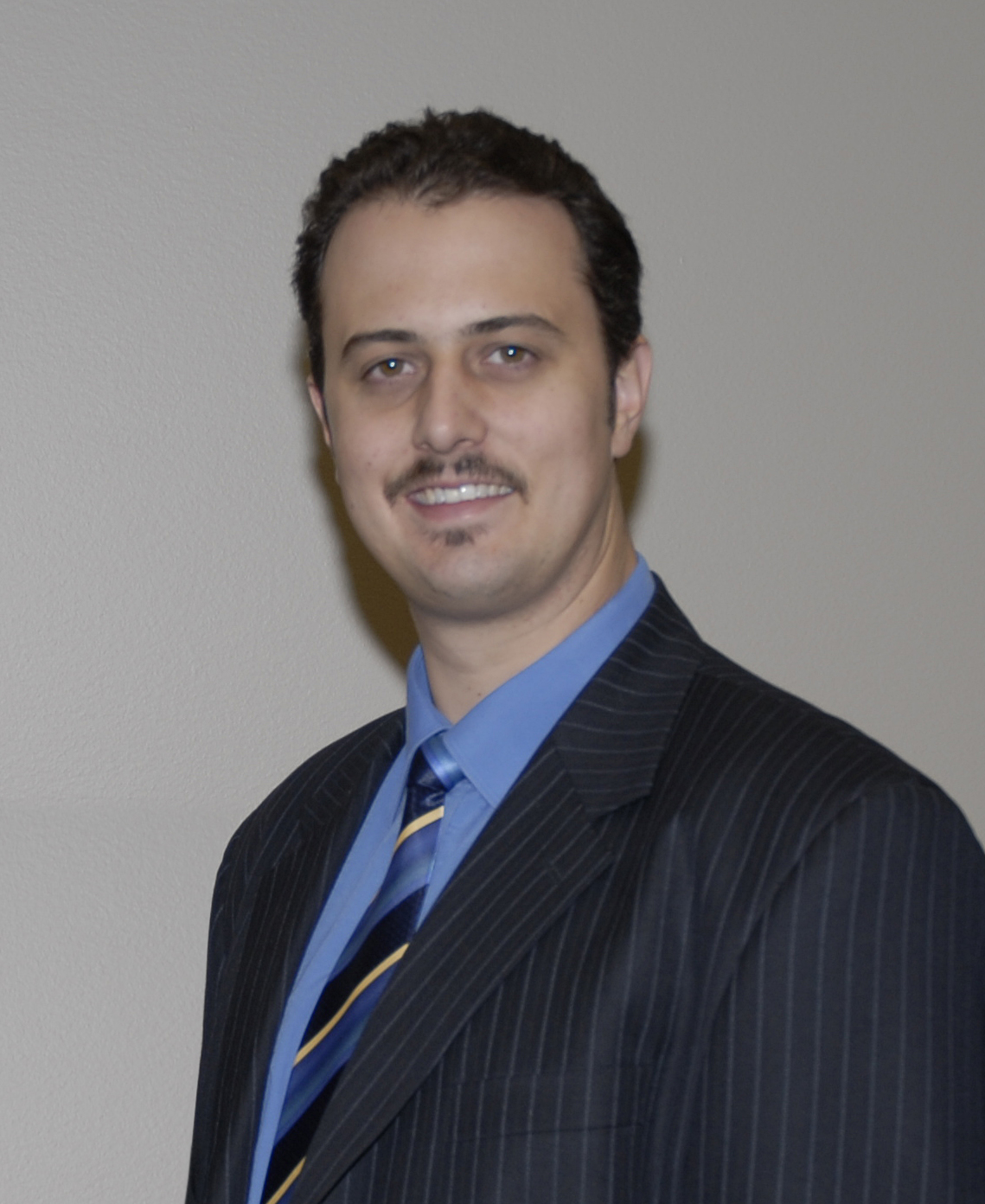
- Born: February 16, 1978 (age 48); Drummondville, Quebec, Canada
- Education: Université de Montréal, University of Lausanne
- Known for: Oil Red O, police technology assessment, ForATE index
- Awards: Edward Foster Award, Member of the Order of Merit of the Police Forces, French Forensic Science Hall of Fame
- Scientific career
- Fields: Fingerprint forensic scientist
- Workplaces: Ministry of Public Security (Quebec), Université du Québec à Trois-Rivières

Alexandre Beaudoin (born February 16, 1978) is a Quebec fingerprint scientist known for inventing a technique for developing latent fingerprints on dry and/or wet porous surfaces (such as paper and cardboard).

== Biography ==
Alexandre Beaudoin was born in Drummondville, Quebec, Canada, in 1978. On May 24, 1997, he married his High school love, Amélie Charron. Together, they have four children: Thalie, Elric, Marek, and Liam. After receiving his BSc in microbiology and immunology at the University of Montreal in 2000, he was hired by the Sûreté du Québec in the Forensic Identification Department as a latent fingerprint development specialist.

In 2003 he obtained a research position as Physical sciences specialist. He also pursues his full-time study during the same period, obtaining a degree of MSc in Health Technology Assessment (HTA) & Management in 2009 with the medical schools of four different universities: University of Montreal, University of Ottawa, Universitat Internacional de Catalunya (Barcelona) and Università Cattolica del Sacro Cuore (Rome).

Since 2006, he is a guest professor at the Canadian Police College and the Ontario Police College about fingerprint chemical development. In 2007, through his work on Oil Red O, he was awarded the Recognition Award – Creativity and Innovation. In 2008, he became President of the Canadian Identification Society. In 2009, he was received by the International Fingerprint Research Group (IFRG), which are invited only the most active and creative researchers of the domain.

In 2010, he founded and became president of the Association Québécoise de Criminalistique which regroup the French forensic specialists. In 2016, he become associate professor with Université du Québec à Trois-Rivières. In 2018, he gets promoted to the position of Forensic Sciences Chief at the Sûreté du Québec. In 2021, he got elected as president of the International Association for Identification (2021-2022) and obtain a degree of Ph.D. in Forensic science from University of Lausanne. Since 2021, he is the Quebec Homeland Security General Manager at the Ministry of Public Security (Quebec).

== Work ==
In 2004, Alexandre Beaudoin successfully made, at the age of 27, the first efficient latent fingerprints development using a technique he has developed based on Oil Red O. The research continued to integrate the method in fingerprint standards sequence development. He then develops the concept of mini-PTA, on the basis of the Danish mini-HTA, consisting in Police Technology Assessment (PTA) for promoting the best technology purchase based on the regional realities of each police department. During his doctoral studies, he produces a thesis on the development of a synthetic pre-acquisition analysis index, the "Forensic Assessment of Technologies Effectiveness" (ForATE), which makes it possible to bridge the gap between forensic science and management.

== Awards ==
- Included in the prestigious Canadian Who's Who, Canada
- Edward Foster Award (Canadian Identification Society, Can)
- Distinguished Member (International Association for Identification)
- Member of the Order of Merit of the Police Forces (M.O.M.) (Orders of Canada)
- French Forensic Science Hall of Fame

== Books ==
- Beaudoin, A; Guillemette, D.Interventions sur une scène de crime, Montreal, Editions Andre Fontaine, 2013
- Beaudoin, A; Guillemette, D.Scène de crime – Guide complet pour les policiers, Montreal, Editions Andre Fontaine, 2016
- Beaudoin, A; Daoust, B; Casault, P. La criminalistique accessible – Guide de survie des empreintes digitales, Montréal, Éditions Yvon Blais, 2018
- Beaudoin, A; Charron, A. Le crime, l'empreinte et la science, Montréal, Éditions MultiMondes, 2018
- Beaudoin, A; Guillemette, D. Interventions sur une scène de crime, 2e Edition, Montreal, Editions Andre Fontaine, 2019
- Beaudoin, A; Guillemette, D; McMullen, L. Essential Guide to Crime Scene Investigation, Montreal, Editions Andre Fontaine, 2020
