= Forensic video analysis =

Analytical process

Forensic video analysis is the scientific examination, comparison and/or evaluation of video in legal matters.

== Forensic video analysis usage ==
Forensic video analysis has been used in a variety of high profile cases, international disagreements, and conflict zones. Video forensics is necessary to show that images and videos used in court and media are verifiably true. Video forensics is especially important when media and governments use video coming from areas of state failure. Much of the video realized from inside Yemen and Syria have caused great political and public concern. Teams at the United Nations as well as within the governments around the world have utilized software and technical knowledge to ensure the information is accurate. Forensic video analysts use specialized software tools for enhancement, authentication, and analysis of digital multimedia evidence. Common capabilities include image extraction, image stabilization, metadata examination, frame averaging and frame rate analysis for speed estimation.

== See also ==
- Audio forensics
- Scientific Working Group on Digital Evidence (SWGDE)
- Scientific Working Group - Imaging Technology (SWIGIT, replaced by SWGDE)
- Video content analysis
