= Brian E. Dalrymple =

Canadian forensic scientist

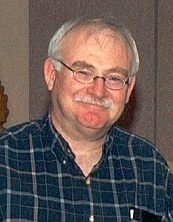
- Born: September 23, 1947 (age 78); Toronto, Ontario, Canada
- Known for: Use of laser in the forensic identification field
- Awards: John A. Dondero Memorial Award, Edward Foster Award, Lewis Marshall Award
- Scientific career
- Fields: Fingerprint Forensic scientist
- Workplaces: Ontario Provincial Police, Brian Dalrymple & Associates

Brian E. Dalrymple is a Canadian fingerprint scientist known for introducing the use of lasers (with colleagues Duff and Menzel) as a forensic light source for fingerprints and other evidence detection, using the Argon Ion Lasers to detect the inherent fluorescence of the latent fingerprints and finding fluorescing evidence. That was the beginning of a real revolution in the forensic identification field. Brian Dalrymple also become the first to use this forensic technique on a real case.

== Biography ==
Brian Ellsworth Dalrymple was born in Toronto on September 23, 1947. He obtained his baccalaureate in 1970 from the Ontario College of Art. He was employed for twenty-eight years by the Ontario Provincial Police (OPP) before retiring. He began at the OPP as a forensic analyst in 1972. During his career, he contributed numerous articles to industry magazines and journals and performed training around the world. He is a member of the International Fingerprint Research Group (IFRG).

== Work ==
In 1977 a collaboration began between Brian Dalrymple and the Xerox Research Centre to develop a new method of using an argon ion laser to detect fingerprints by inherent fluorescence. The OPP became the first police agency in the world to use this new technology on a regular basis. The laser technique is a non-destructive method that allows the use of other fingerprint detection following the laser observation. This use of the laser also led to the use of new staining chemicals on fingerprints to render them fluorescent. This technique can detect fingerprints that could not be revealed by other methods.

== Awards ==
- Included in the prestigious Canadian Who's Who, Canada
- 1980 - John A. Dondero Award (International Association for Identification, US)
- 1980 - The Award of Merit (American Institute of Applied Science, US)
- 1982 - Edward Foster Award (Canadian Identification Society, Can)
- 1984 - Lewis Marshall Award (Fingerprint Society, UK)
- 2011 - Distinguished Member (International Association for Identification, US)

== Books ==
- Nafte, M; Dalrymple, B. Crime and Measurement: Methods in Forensic Investigation, Carolina Academic Press, Durham, NC, 2011
- Dalrymple, B. The Skin of Murder Victims: Fingerprints and Other Evidence, Carolina Academic Press, Durham, NC, 2014
- Dalrymple, B. Finding Evidence with Chemistry and Light, 2009
- Dalrymple, B. Finding Evidence with Chemistry and Light, Rev. 2013
