= Handwriting expertise =

Handwriting expertise may refer to:

- Calligraphy, design and execution of lettering with a writing instrument
- Diplomatics, scholarly analysis of documents, especially historical documents
- Graphology, pseudoscience involving analysis of handwriting in an attempt to determine the writer's personality traits
- Palaeography, study of historical writing systems
- Questioned document examination, examination of handwriting to assess potential authorship of a piece of evidence in a legal proceeding

== See also ==
- Forensic handwriting examination (disambiguation)
