= Journal of the American Society of Questioned Document Examiners =

- Discipline: Forensic science
- Language: English
- Edited by: Nikolaos Kalantzis

Publication details
- History: 1998-present
- Publisher: American Society of Questioned Document Examiners (United States)
- Frequency: Biannual

Standard abbreviations
- ISO 4: J. Am. Soc. Quest. Doc. Exam.

Indexing
- ISSN: 1524-7287
- OCLC no.: 41163002

Links
- Journal homepage

The Journal of the American Society of Questioned Document Examiners is a peer-reviewed academic journal that publishes original research papers, technical aids, reviews of current practises or procedures, as well as historical articles relating to forensic document examination. The journal was established in June 1998 and is published biannually by the American Society of Questioned Document Examiners.

The editor-in-chief is Nikolaos Kalantzis.

The ASQDE moved the Journal from being subscription-based to full open-access in 2024.
