= David R. Ashbaugh =

Canadian police officer

David Robinson Ashbaugh
- Born: March 11, 1946 (age 80)
- Known for: First use of the term ridgeology in forensic identification, introduction of the ACE-V methodology in the field
- Awards: John A. Dondero Memorial Award, Edward Foster Award
- Scientific career
- Fields: Fingerprint Forensic scientist
- Workplaces: Royal Canadian Mounted Police

David R. Ashbaugh is a Canadian police officer known for his extensive research on the friction ridge identification, introducing for the first time the use of the term ridgeology in forensic identification and the ACE-V methodology. David Ashbaugh also wrote and published a fundamental and essential reference book for the entire forensic identification community : Quantitative-Qualitative Friction Ridge Analysis: An Introduction to Basic and Advanced Ridgeology.

== Biography ==
David Ashbaugh was born on 11 March 1946. He worked for more than thirty years at the Royal Canadian Mounted Police before retiring in 2004. During his career, he served more than twenty years as a certified forensic identification specialist. During his career, he contribute numerous articles to the field magazines and journals and made a lot of training around the world.

== Work ==
David Ashbaugh made extensive research on the science of fingerprint identification. In the 80’s, he introduced in the field the ACE-V methodology for fingerprint identification, where ACE-V stand for Analysis, Comparison, Evaluation, and Verification. In 1983, Ashbaugh published the first article using the term ridgeology in forensic identification, creating also the terms level 1, level 2, and level 3 detail now in use in the identification community. In 1999, he authored a book treating of ridgeology methods, poroscopy, edgeoscopy, pressure distortion, and more.

== Awards ==
- Henry Medal (Finger Print Society of the United Kingdom) 2012
- John A. Dondero Award (International Association for Identification, US)
- Edward Foster Award (Canadian Identification Society, Can)
- William Donald Dixon Memorial Research and Essay Award (Canadian Identification Society)
- Meritorious Service Medal (Canada)
- Order of Merit for Police Forces (Canada)
- Commissioner's Commendation for Outstanding Service (Commissioner Royal Canadian Mounted Police)
- Lewis Minshall Award (The Fingerprint Society of the United Kingdom)
- The Good of the Association Award (International Association for Identification)
- Canada 125 Medal (Government of Canada)
- Queen Elizabeth II Golden Jubilee Commemorative Medal (Government of Canada)
- Distinguished Member (International Association for Identification)
- Identification Progress Award (Ontario Police College)

== Books ==
- Ashbaugh, DR. Quantitative-Qualitative Friction Ridge Analysis: An Introduction to Basic and Advanced Ridgeology, CRC Press, 1999
