= Sequence determination =

Forensic examination

A sequence determination is a type of examination conducted by a forensic document examiner. This type of forensic examination is done in an attempt to determine which of two events occurred first in the preparation of a document. Another term used for this type of examination is "sequence of intersections" since the evaluation requires intersection of physical materials on the document.

== Types ==
- Sequence of Strokes: term for examinations involving two or more writing strokes from one or more writing instruments
- Sequence determinations for writing ink with other types of material:
  - Ballpoint pen ink/toner sequence
  - Ballpoint pen ink/inkjet ink sequence
  - Writing instrument/paper fold sequence
  - Writing instrument/typewriting sequence
- Other sequence determinations:
  - Toner/paper fold sequence

== Methods ==
The primary means of evaluation involves direct visual examination using microscopy and various lighting options. The intersection point may involve subtle deviations from the normal manner of deposition or production that can be observed on microscopic examination (e.g. extraneous ink deposits, skipping, misalignments, embossing, etc.). The lifting/casting technique (see below) has also been tested with some success. Intersections involving indentations may also be assessed using an electrostatic detection device to visualize latent indentations.

- Binocular optical microscopy
- Scanning electron microscopy
- Atomic force microscopy
- Lifting techniques
  - Kromekote paper method
  - Mikrosil casting method
- Electrostatic detection device (EDD) method

== Significance ==
The underlying concept is that each of the sequences will produce a distinctive result that can be visualized or measured.

In some instances, the results will be essentially conclusive with only one reasonable interpretation. In other situations, the results may be less definite in that the observed features may permit more than one interpretation of the original sequence.
