= Gil Anderson =

No article on Gil Anderson currently exists but the following are closely related to that spelling:

- Gillian Anderson (born 1968), American actress
- Gil Andersen (1879–1935), Norwegian-American race car driver
- Gail Anderson (disambiguation)
