= Journal of the Canadian Society of Forensic Science =

Canadian Society of Forensic Science Journal
- Discipline: Forensic science
- Language: English, French
- Edited by: Brian Yamashita

Publication details
- History: 1968-present
- Publisher: Taylor & Francis on behalf of the Canadian Society of Forensic Science (Canada)
- Frequency: Quarterly

Standard abbreviations
- ISO 4: Can. Soc. Forensic Sci. J.

Indexing
- CODEN: JCFSBP
- ISSN: 0008-5030 (print); 2332-1660 (web)
- OCLC no.: 16515635

Links
- Journal homepage; Online access; Online archive

The Canadian Society of Forensic Science Journal is a quarterly peer-reviewed academic journal which publishes original research papers, comments, and reviews relating to all aspects of forensic science. It was established in 1968, and is published by Taylor & Francis on behalf of the Canadian Society of Forensic Science. Articles may be published in either English or French.

The journal offers an option to publish gold open access.

== Editorial board ==
The editor-in-chief is Brian Yamashita (Forensic Science and Identification Services, Royal Canadian Mounted Police).

Associate Editors:

- Rolanda Lam, Royal Canadian Mounted Police
- Cyril Muehlethaler, Université du Québec à Trois-Rivières
- Theresa Stotesbury, Ontario Tech University
- Karen Woodall, University of Toronto

Editorial Board members:

- G. S. Anderson - Simon Fraser University
- C. Boisvert - Laboratoire de sciences judiciaires et de médicine légale (FR)
- F. Chafe - MacEwan University
- G. J. Davis - University of Kentucky College of Medicine, United States
- S. Forbes - Université du Québec à Trois-Rivières
- C. Hageman - Ontario Tech University
- N. Hearns - Royal Canadian Mounted Police
- R. Langille - Ontario Centre of Forensic Sciences (retired)
- J. Marshall - Trent University
- P. Mayne Correia - University of Alberta
- R. Schimpf - Royal Canadian Mounted Police
- T. Tanaka - Private practice
- J. G. Wigmore - Private practice

== Abstracting and indexing ==
The journal is abstracted and indexed in Excerpta Medica and Chemical Abstracts Service.

According to the Taylor & Francis, the journal had a 2022 Source Normalized Impact per Paper (SNIP) factor of 0.220.
