= Forensic handwriting examination =

Forensic handwriting examination may refer to:

- questioned document examination
- forensic palaeography or diplomatics
