= Gail Anderson =

Gail Anderson may refer to:

- Gail Anderson (entomologist), Canadian entomologist
- Gail Anderson (graphic designer) (born 1962), American graphic designer

== See also ==
- Gail Anderson-Dargatz (born 1963), Canadian novelist
