= European Network of Forensic Science Institutes =

European forensic science network

- European Network of Forensic Science Institutes
- Abbreviation: ENFSI
- Formation: October 20, 1995
- Type: Non-profit
- Purpose: Improving mutual exchange of information, and the quality of service delivery, in the field of Forensic Science
- Location: Wiesbaden, Germany
- Region served: Europe, International
- Chairperson: Dorijan Kerzan
- Website: https://enfsi.eu

The European Network of Forensic Science Institutes (ENFSI) was founded in 1995 in order to facilitate dialogue among the forensic science practitioners of Europe, as well as improving the quality of forensic science delivery. It has close cooperation with European police forces. In addition to quality, research, and education, different forensic disciplines address domain-relevant issues within expert working groups (EWGs) to the highest degree such that ENFSI is recognized as the monopoly organization for forensics science by the European Commission. ENFSI functions as a non-profit organization.

The number of member laboratories has increased since ENFSI's inception from 11 member laboratories in 1993 to 71 in 2019. As of May 2020, membership comes from 39 countries spread across Europe. Non-European laboratories are also permitted to be involved in ENFSI as 'Associate' member laboratories under a specific Expert Working Group.

== History ==
Representatives from 11 governmental forensic laboratories in Western Europe attended a preliminary meeting in 1993 in Rijswijk, Netherlands. The official founding meeting occurred on October 20, 1995 in Rijswijk and was open to all European countries. A memorandum of understanding was signed which governed its operation. The first constitution for ENFSI was accepted by the membership in 1999, and the ENFSI website was created. A new constitution was approved in 2004 when personal membership was discontinued in favour of an institutional membership, and membership fees were enacted. The European Commission recognised ENFSI in 2009 and in 2015 at the decision was made to move the secretariat from Poland to Germany.

== Structure ==
ENFSI is governed by an executive branch consisting of a five-member Board and a Secretariat. There are also two standing committees or advisory groups; one for Quality & Competency, and another for Research & Development. Individual forensic disciplines are represented by various Expert Working Groups.

=== Board and Secretariat ===
The ENFSI Board governs the activities of the organization and consists of five members elected from, and accountable to, the general membership. The Board consists of a chairperson, a treasurer, and various members. The ENFSI Secretariat is accountable to and operates under the supervision of the Board to provide support for ENFSI activities. It is hosted by the Federal Criminal Police Office (BKA) in Wiesbaden, Germany, with two persons serving in that capacity.

=== Standing committees ===
ENFSI has two Standing Committees. These are the Quality & Competence Committee (QCC), and the Research & Development Committee (R&D).

The QCC is responsible for policy development relating to Quality Assurance and Competence Assurance, the provision of advise to Expert Working Groups as well as ENFSI members, and assisting member laboratories.

The RDSC is responsible for ENFSI's Research and Development Strategy, the provision of advice to Expert Working Groups and ENFSI members, facilitation of joint research between laboratories, and facilitation of education and training courses in specialised areas.

=== Membership ===
General membership in ENFSI is open to European forensic science institutes and agencies that meet specific criteria. Membership is not based on the individual practitioner but rather by institution or agency. There are, however, a limited number of honorary memberships that have been granted to individuals deemed noteworthy.

Membership with ENFSI (in a non-voting capacity) is also available to non-ENFSI institutions, in Europe or elsewhere, through Associate Membership with a given Expert Working Group, so long as the institution meets specific criteria. Permanent and Associate member agencies pay annual dues to ENFSI.

=== Expert Working Groups ===
ENFSI has seventeen Expert Working Groups (EWGs) actively collaborating on furthering their respective disciplines:

- Animal, Plant and Soil Traces (APST)
- Digital Imaging (DIWG)
- DNA - Advances in DNA profiling techniques are disseminated to each country with the European DNA Profiling Group (EDNAP), which was set up in 1988.
- Documents (EDEWG)
- Drugs (DWG)
- Explosives (FINEX)
- Fingerprint (EFP-WG)
- Firearms/Gunshot residue (FAID/GSR)
- Fire and Explosions Investigation (FEIWG)
- Forensic Information Technology (FIT)
- Forensic Speech and Audio Analysis (FSAAWG)
- Handwriting (ENFHEX)
- Marks
- Paint & Glass (EPGWG)
- Road Accident Analysis (RAAEWG)
- Scene of Crime
- Textile and Hair (ETHG)

== Projects and activities ==
ENFSI collaborates with many institutions and agencies (both national and international in scope), including the following:

- ENFSI collaborated with the French Institut National de Police Scientifique (INPS) in 2011 to establish a European database of ink dyes and stained banknotes.
- Another joint project with the European Monitoring Centre for Drugs and Drug Addiction (EMCDDA) and the Customs Laboratories European Network (CLEN) is a database for controlled substances using nuclear magnetic resonance (NMW) imaging.
- In 2015, ENFSI concluded a memorandum of understanding with Europol, the European Union's law enforcement agency, which permits the "exchange of knowledge and expertise, underpinning the need for enhanced cooperation in the area of forensic science in the fight against crime."
- In 2020, the European Commission awarded funding to the ENFSI Secretariat in support of, among other things, ENFSI activities and initiatives with that funding administered by the Directorate-General for Migration and Home Affairs.

Another key activity involves competency assessment and quality assurance. Each of the working groups develops and implements annual tests, usually called collaborative exercises or proficiency tests.

ENFSI also “urges all its members to seek accreditation.” The organization's official policy states “All ENFSI member laboratories should have achieved or should be taking steps towards ISO/IEC 17025 compliant accreditation for their laboratory testing activities.” In 2007 around 40% of the laboratories affiliated with the ENFSI were accredited and the figure was nearly 70% in 2011.

Many of the above activities are integral to the Council of the European Union's attempts to standardize the practise of forensic science throughout Europe. This falls under the European Forensic Science Area program (aka, EFSA 2020).

It works with the European Union Agency for Law Enforcement Training (CEPOL).

It organises events and conferences, and promotes collaboration between research across Europe and internationally.

The European Document Experts Working Group (EDEWG) is actively investigating the use of artificial intelligence in document examination problems.

=== Best Practice Manuals (BPMs) ===
One of the activities that the working groups perform is to devise best practice manuals (BMPs) to carry out detailed analyses by each discipline.

1. On 2018-01-18, the Digital Imaging Working Group published the Best Practice Manual for Facial Image Comparison which discusses Human-based 1:1, or 1:many, facial image comparisons.
2. On 2022-12-22, the Firearms/GSR Working Group released the first version of the Best Practice Manual for the Forensic Examination of Inorganic Gunshot Residue by SEM/EDS which discusses the analysis of inorganic gunshot residue (GSR) using scanning electron microscopy/energy-dispersive X-ray spectrometry (SEM/EDS).

=== Forensic Guidelines ===
ENFSI has published various guidelines intended for laboratories and practitioners., including the following:

1. On 2015-03-08, ENFSI published their Guideline For Evaluative Reporting aiming to “... to standardise and improve evaluative reporting in ENFSI laboratories.” To that end, the guideline “... provides all reporting forensic practitioners with a recommended framework for formulating evaluative reports and related requirements for the case file.”
2. On 2023-02-02, the Digital Imaging Working Group published the Guideline for Facial Recognition System End Users which discusses the examination of face images through automated facial recognition systems with the scope being "...specific to retrospective 1:N identification searches for law enforcement, investigatory and forensic applications." As such, the document does not address such things as "...live (real time) FR, border control and access to secure sites...", or "Human 1:1 facial image comparison...".

=== Triennial European Academy of Forensic Science Conference ===
Every three years, the European Academy of Forensic Science (EAFS) Conference is held under the patronage of ENFSI. The 2022 conference was held in Stockholm, Sweden on May 30 – June 3, 2022.

== Honours ==
In 2018, the Distinguished Forensic Scientist Award was given to the first female recipient, Niamh Nic Daéid.

== See also ==
- European Society of Human Genetics
- International Society for Forensic Genetics
