= Niamh Nic Daéid =

Irish forensic scientist

Niamh Nic Daéid FRSC FRSE
- Born: 1967 (age 58–59); Dundee, Scotland
- Occupation: Forensic scientist
- Title: Professor of Forensic Science

Academic background
- Education: Dublin Institute of Technology; Trinity College Dublin; Royal College of Surgeons in Ireland

Academic work
- Institutions: University of Strathclyde; University of Dundee

Niamh Nic Daéid is an Irish forensic scientist. She is Professor of Forensic Science and Director of the Leverhulme Research Centre for Forensic Science at the University of Dundee. In 2014, Nic Daéid was appointed as Professor of Forensic Science at the Centre for Anatomy and Human Identification at the University of Dundee, having been an academic at the University of Strathclyde for 20 years, where she was the first woman to earn a personal chair in the Department of Chemistry.

== Early life and education ==
Niamh Nic Daéid was born in 1967 in Dundee, Scotland and grew up in Ireland. Her parents were scientists involved in the investigation of fires, and she and her brother earned pocket money as children sticking their parents' fire scene photographs into scientific reports. She earned a bachelor's degree in Chemistry and Mathematics from the Dublin Institute of Technology and Trinity College, Dublin, followed by a PhD in bio inorganic chemistry from the Royal College of Surgeons in Ireland.

== Career and research ==
In 2017 Nic Daéid was appointed as an expert witness for Grenfell Tower public inquiry presenting oral evidence for the Public Inquiry on two occasions. In 2014, Nic Daéid was appointed as Professor of Forensic Science at the Centre for Anatomy and Human Identification at the University of Dundee, having been an academic at the University of Strathclyde for 20 years, where she rose to be the first woman to earn a personal chair in the Department of Chemistry.

Nic Daéid has a leadership position with INTERPOL and the European Network of Forensic Science Institutes (ENFSI). She is chair of the European fire and explosion investigation working group.

== Media appearances ==
In January 2025 Nic Daéd appeared in the first episode of the second series of Lucy Worsley Investigates on BBC Two, providing a modern view of how the infamous Jack the Ripper case was handled by scientific experts at the time.

== Honours and awards ==
In 2015 she was elected a Fellow of the Royal Society of Edinburgh.
