= Scientific Working Group – Imaging Technology =

The Scientific Working Group on Imaging Technology was convened by the Federal Bureau of Investigation in 1997 to provide guidance to law enforcement agencies and others in the criminal justice system regarding the best practices for photography, videography, and video and image analysis. This group was terminated in 2015.

== History ==
As technology has advanced through the years, law enforcement has needed to stay abreast of emerging technological advances and use these in the investigation of crime. A factor that is considered when new technology is used in these investigations is the determination of whether the use of that new technology will be admissible in court. The judicial system in the United States currently has two standards used in the determination of admissibility of testimony regarding scientific evidence; the Daubert Standard and the Frye Standard. These standards guide the courts in the admissibility of testimony derived from the use of new technologies and scientific techniques. The Federal Bureau of Investigation (FBI), seeking to address possible admissibility issues with such testimony, established Scientific Working Groups starting with the Scientific Working Group on DNA Analysis and Methods (SWGDAM) in 1988. The goal of these groups is to open lines of communication between law enforcement agencies and forensic laboratories around the world while providing guidance on the use of new and innovative technologies and techniques. This guidance can lead to admissibility of evidence and/or testimony, provided proper methods in the collection of evidence and its analysis are employed. In 2009, the National Academy of Sciences released a report entitled, "Strengthening Forensic Science in the United States: A Path Forward." This report addresses many topics including challenges and disparities facing the forensic science community, standardization, certification of practitioners and accreditation of their respective entities, problems related to the interpretation of forensic evidence, the need for research, and the admission of forensic science evidence in litigation. This report mentions the Scientific Working Groups and their role in forensic science.

The history of imaging technology (photography) can be said to extend back to the times of Chinese philosopher Mo-Ti (470-390 B.C.) who described the principles behind the precursor to the camera obscura. Since that time, advances in imaging technology include the discovery of chemical photographic processes in the 19th century and the use of electronic imaging technology that includes analog video cameras and digital video and still cameras. By the mid 1990s, it was apparent that technologically advanced camera systems such as these were being adopted for use in the criminal justice system. This led the FBI to convene a meeting of individuals working in the field of forensic imaging from federal, state, local, and foreign law enforcement, and the U.S. military, during the summer of 1997. As a result of this meeting, the Technical Working Group on Imaging Technology was formed from a core group of the meeting’s participants. This group later became the Scientific Working Group on Imaging Technology (SWGIT). Prior to the inception of SWGIT, some law enforcement agencies began adopting digital imaging technology. Due to the lack of guidelines or standards, some of these agencies attempted to replace all their film cameras with substandard digital cameras, only to find that the equipment they had purchased was not capable of accomplishing the mission for which they were intended. At that time only low resolution digital cameras were deemed affordable by some law enforcement agencies. Some of these agencies were forced to rethink their photography procedures and reverted to the use of film cameras or replaced their low-resolution digital cameras with higher quality, more expensive equipment. Also lacking at this early stage was guidance on how to store and archive digital image files. When SWGIT was formed, it was tasked with providing guidance to law enforcement and others in the criminal justice system by releasing documents that describe the best practices and guidelines for the use of imaging technology, to include these concerns and many others. This group was terminated in 2015.

== SWGIT Function ==
During its existence, SWGIT provided information on the appropriate use of various imaging technologies including both established and new. This was accomplished through the release of documents such as the SWGIT Best Practices documents. As changes in technology occurred, these documents were updated. Over the course of its existence, SWGIT collaborated with other Scientific Working Groups to address imaging concerns within their respective disciplines. SWGIT published over 20 documents that dealt specifically with imaging technology. SWGIT also co-published documents with the Scientific Working Group on Digital Evidence (SWGDE) that had a component or components dealing with imaging technology. SWGIT also provided imaging technology guidance and input for documents from the Scientific Working Group on Friction Ridge Analysis, Study and Technology (SWGFAST), the Scientific Working Group for Forensic Document Examination (SWGDOC), and the Scientific Working Group on Shoeprint and Tire Tread Evidence (SWGTREAD). SWGIT assisted the American Society of Crime Lab Directors/Laboratory Accreditation Board (ASCLD/LAB) in the writing of definitions and standards for the accreditation of Digital and Multimedia Evidence sections of crime laboratories. In addition to releasing documents, SWGIT members disseminated best practices for law enforcement professionals where imaging technology was concerned. This was carried out by attending and lecturing at meetings and conferences of various forensic organizations that included:

- The American Academy of Forensic Sciences (AAFS)
- The International Association for Identification (IAI)
- The Law Enforcement and Emergency Services Video Association (LEVA)
- The American Society of Crime Lab Directors (ASCLD)

The SWGIT membership consisted of approximately fifty scientists, photographers, instructors, and managers from more than two dozen federal, state, and local law enforcement agencies, as well as from the academic and research communities. The membership elected its officers from within. SWGIT was composed of the Executive Committee, four standing subcommittees, and ad hoc subcommittees appointed on an as-needed basis. The standing subcommittees were: Image Analysis, Forensic Photography, Video, and Outreach. This group was terminated in 2015.

== Legal Proceedings ==
The following court cases have conducted Daubert v. Merrell Dow Pharm., Inc., 509 U.S. 579 (1993) hearings in which SWGIT best practice documents have been cited as accepted protocol, methodology, and as generally accepted techniques in the forensic community:

- U. S. v. Rudy Frabizio, U.S. District Court, Boston, MA, 2008 (Image Authentication)
- U.S. v. Nobumochi Furukawa, U.S. District Court, Minnesota, 2007 (Video Authentication)
- U.S. v. John Stroman, U.S. District Court, South Carolina, 2007 (Facial Comparison Analysis)
- State of Texas v. Daniel Day, Tarrant County Texas, 2005 (Camera Identification to Images)
- U.S. v. Marc Watzman, U.S. District Court, Northern Illinois, 2004 (Video Authentication)
- U.S. v. McKreith, U.S. District Court, Fort Lauderdale, FL, 2002 (Photo comparison of shirt)

== Termination ==
This group was unfunded by the FBI in 2015.
