= Edgeoscopy =

Method of identification

Edgeoscopy is a method of identification through the examination of the unique details and characteristics found along the edges of individual fingerprint ridges. These characteristics are the result of the alignment and shape of the individual ridge units and the relationship between them, as well as the effects of pores that are close to the edge of the ridges. These shapes are only of use when quality of the friction ridges found in both the latent fingerprint and the exemplar print is high. The method was pioneered by Salil Chatterjee in 1962, who created it while researching the possibility of a new criminal identification method.
