= Electrostatic detection device =

Equipment for questioned document examination

An electrostatic detection device (EDD) is a specialized piece of equipment commonly used in questioned document examination to reveal indentations or impressions in paper that may otherwise go unnoticed. It is a non-destructive technique (will not damage the evidence in question), allowing further tests to be carried out. It is a sensitive technique capable of detecting indentations on pages several layers below the top sheet and many years after the indentations were created.

EDD equipment and investigative techniques were central to overturning a number of convictions in the United Kingdom, as it was possible to demonstrate that witness statements had been altered or signed as blank pages in reverse order to the main notes. This was central in a number of cases investigated at the West Midlands Serious Crime Squad that were appealed. The allegations of tampering with evidence and witness statements led to the unit being disbanded, and over 60 convictions being quashed, many of the appeals relying on EDD evidence.

== How it works ==
When writing is fashioned on a sheet of paper resting upon other pages, the indentations or impressions produced are transferred to those below. These transferred impressions can be detected using an EDD.

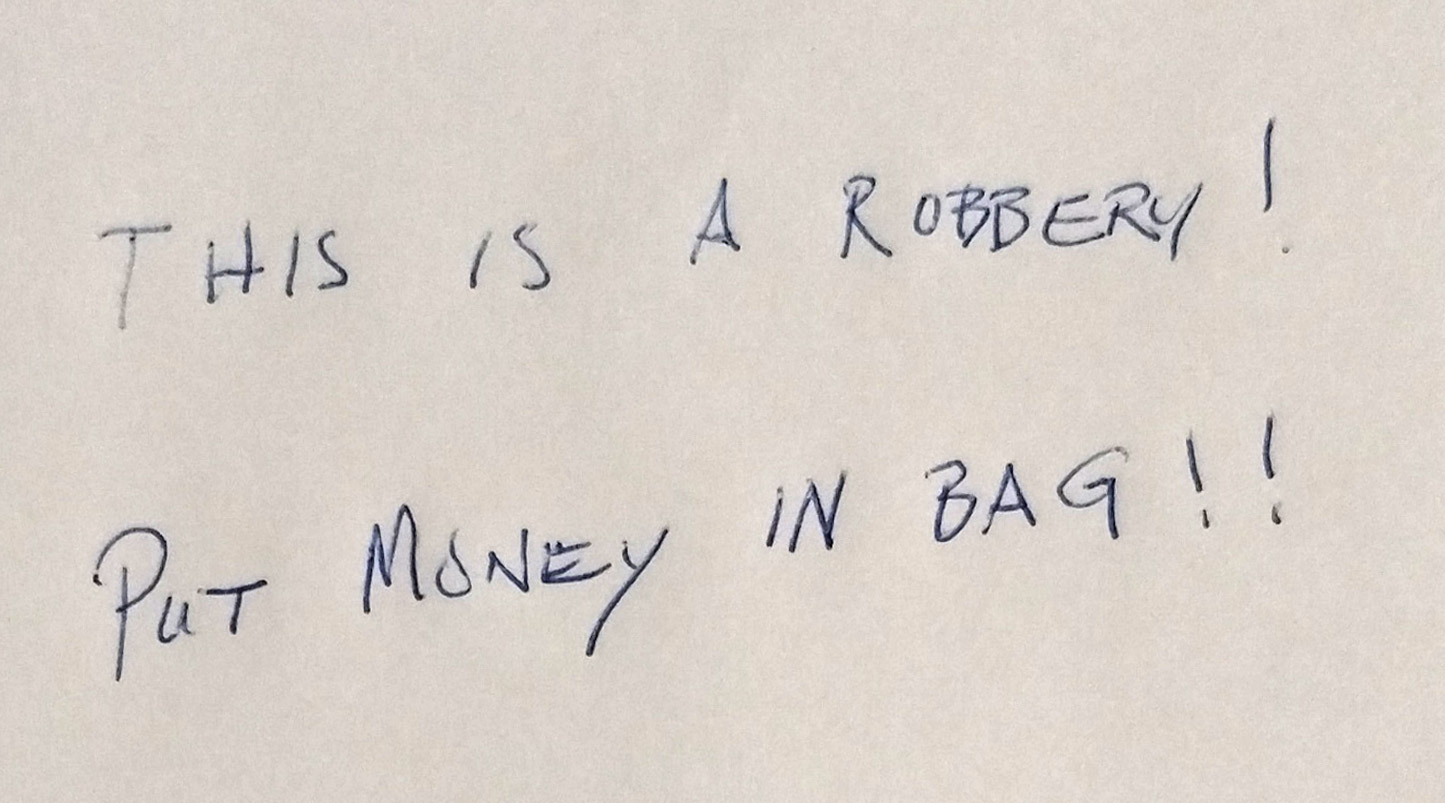
Mock-up of a handprinted robbery note written on the top-most sheet of a pile of papers

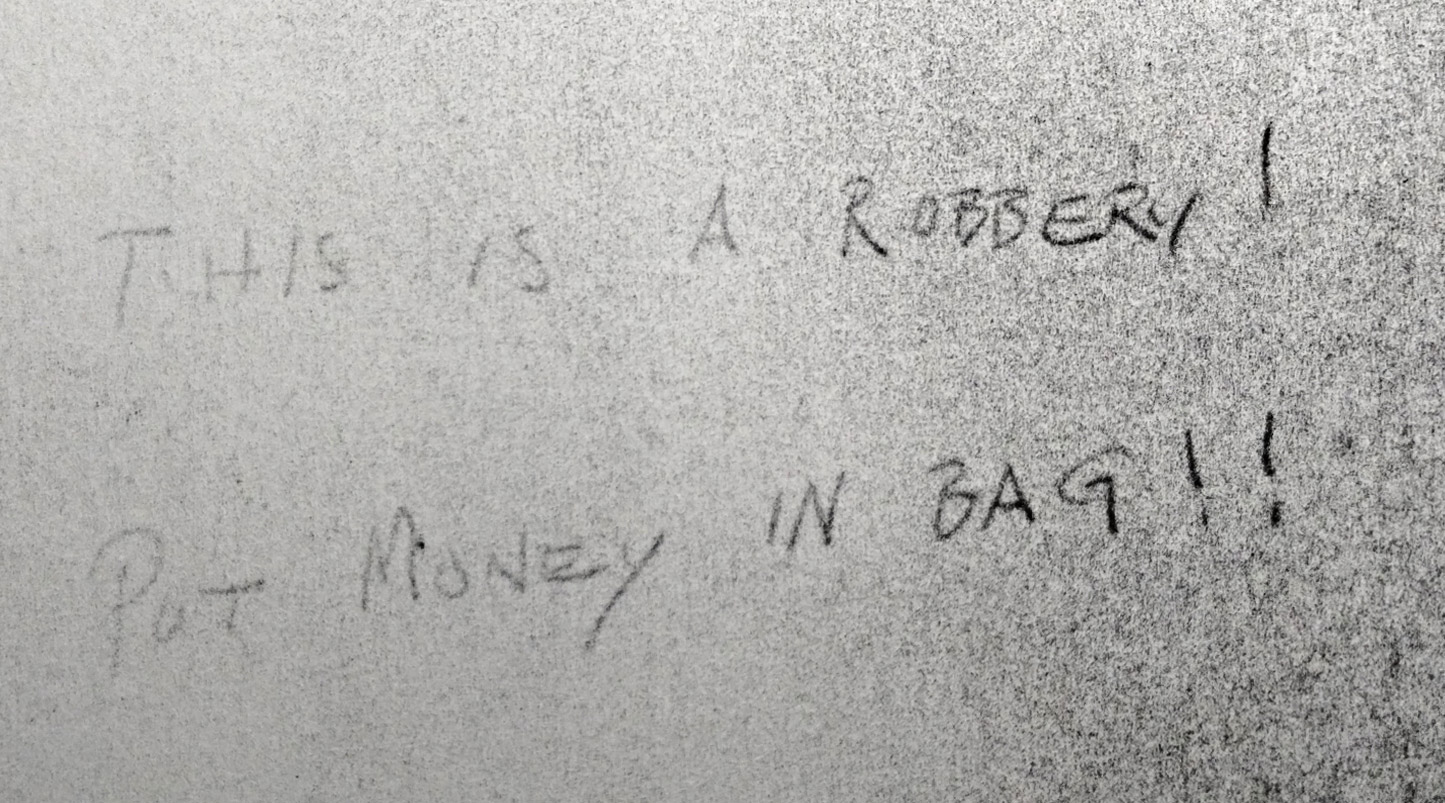
Example ESDA result developed on a sheet of paper positioned beneath the written note at the time of writing (shown above), and developed using the bead cascade method

In some situations, a questioned document such as a ransom note, or an extortion letter, may exist which can be determined to be the source of indentations detected on another piece of paper (e.g., an offender's notepad). Alternatively, indentations detected on a business contract might match information present on another such document. In some situations this would be an entirely innocent finding; however, if the two businesses are supposed to be operating independent of one another, then the finding could be significant. Decipherable indentations may also provide valuable information even when a second document is not present or cannot be located. For example, an anonymous letter may bear impressions of writing that relate to some mundane activity of the offender which could ultimately lead an investigator to a particular suspect.

The electro-physical basis whereby an EDD actually works is complex. The original theory suggested that the paper sandwiched between the grounded platen and the mylar charging film acted as a type of capacitor with the change in capacitance being due to differing compression of the paper. This led to models like the 'Thickness Variation Theory' and the 'Surface Variation Theory'. However, it turns out that a detectable 'indentation' is not due to the physical pressure applied to the writing instrument as one might expect. Rather, Seward in 1998 and 1999 proposed an alternative theory explaining the detection capability of an EDD as being due to a surface charge effect created by paper-to-paper friction specifically in the area where a writing instrument is pressed down into the top-most sheet of paper. Seward's model was based upon "charge transport through the Mylar-paper-platen structure" and is appropriately called the 'charge transport model'.

Subsequent testing^{,} demonstrated that the charge transport model, while not perfect, is sound. This testing also clarified that areas of indentation are less negatively charged than surrounding areas. It is this relative difference in potential that causes the toner to be attracted to the areas of indentation, rather than other areas on the mylar surface.

Seward's model also helps to explain two unusual phenomena sometimes observed when using an EDD:

1. 'pure' indentations caused by impact printing, for example, may not produce good EDD results
2. indirect secondary 'impressions' may appear that are caused by lateral relative motion between two sheets of paper when the source sheet bears significant embossing.

Additionally, indentations can sometimes not develop very well even though they are clearly visible. This may occur, for example, with very heavy or deep impressions or with impressions in glossy heavy-weight paper such as that used for brochures. In such situations, it is possible to use digital scanning and image-processing to document such writing impressions.

== Practical use ==
Despite the complexity of the underlying theoretical mechanism, the practical use of an EDD is straightforward. Most devices are similar in their operation. The following are the key steps in using an EDD to visualize indentations:

- Evaluation of material

1. Assess adequacy of material for examination: an EDD works best when used on a single sheet of clean, smooth paper (that is, paper without wrinkles, creases or stains). The presence of any of these factors may preclude effective examination or, at the minimum, mean that the results will be limited. Heavy-weight, coated or treated papers often produce poor results. The purported age of the document is not generally a factor of concern. Latent indentations have been developed on documents older than fifty years.
2. Examination using side (oblique) lighting: as a general rule, all items should be examined using side lighting. This is important because visual examination may detect deep indentations even though the EDD may fail to develop those indentations properly.
3. Documents that have been subjected to high levels of humidity will not generally retain indentations. As a result, other forensic examinations involving the wetting of a document, such as fingerprint development using a ninhydrin solution, should not be done until after examination for indentations.

- Preparation

1. Humidification: an EDD works best when the relative humidity is less than 60%. Some studies have also suggested that absolute humidity is important. To help ensure proper humidification, most manufacturers provide a 'humidification chamber' that can be used to prepare a document for examination. Over-humidification is also possible, so care must be taken to not actually wet the document.
2. Fitness-for-use (FFU) test; AKA, control sample: since an EDD may fail to detect indentations when they are actually present (for a variety of reasons), it is important to check on the equipment's performance using a control sample (commonly called a FFU test) known to have indentations. Recommendations include using a FFU test sample at the beginning and end of a series involving the examination of multiple questioned documents, or placing a small FFU test sample adjacent to each questioned document on the platen. The FFU test can be prepared by hand using a similar writing instrument and similar paper. Alternatively, a special device call the 'Gradient®' can be used to produce control indentations that vary in depth in a known manner thereby permitting the examiner to determine not only that the EDD is working but also the degree to which it is sensitive. It is not essential to precisely match the questioned document in terms of paper type or pen type since the objective is to show that the device is functioning properly.

- Placement on platen: the goal is to place the questioned document flat on the platen surface with few wrinkles or distortions (ideally, none). The document should not extend beyond the platen edges and enough room should be present around the document to allow the charging film (see below) to seal against the platen surface.

1. Type of document: as noted above, an EDD works well with a single sheet of paper up to a legal-sized sheet. However, if there are concerns about biological or chemical contamination, due to the condition of the questioned document, it is possible to use a second sheet of clean paper, e.g. copier paper, known to be free of indentations as a barrier between the platen and questioned document. Books and other multipage items can also be examined in some instances but these require additional preparation. Ideally, individual pages should be removed from such items but this is not always possible. As an alternative, a sheet of conductive material (e.g., aluminum foil) can be used to contact the conductive surface.
2. Covering with charging film: As noted above, the charging film should cover the document completely and contact the platen all the way around the document. The charging film serves two purposes: it protects the document from subsequent toner application and it takes the electrostatic charge required to 'develop' any latent indentations on the document. The film should be laid over the document taking care to avoid wrinkles or excessive stretching of the film. Most EDD devices have a roll of bulk film positioned adjacent to the device for ease in application. The charging film will adhere to the platen due to suction applied through the surface of the platen.

- Charging of surface: the top surface of the charging film must be electrostatically charged. To achieve this most EDDs use a shielded (grounded) hand-held unit containing a high-tension corona wire which is usually about 7kV. It is turned on and literally waved over the entire surface of platen for several seconds criss-crossing the platen area. The objective is to produce an evenly distributed electrostatic charge in the air above the surface of the charging film. After passing the unit over the platen, the examiner waits for a few minutes until the charge has been passed to the surface of the charging film.
- Application of toner to develop indentations. The EDD is able to visualize indentations because the surface is differentially charged depending upon whether or not an indentation is present. The negatively charged toner particles are attracted to areas where there are indentations in the paper surface. Once an electrostatic charge has been applied to the charging film, the latent indentations can be developed. This is done using a powder toner very much like toner found in any electrophotographic printing device. There are various methods used for this purpose.
  - Cascade method: Some EDDs have a platen that is hinged on one edge to permit it to be tilted. A mixture of toner and small carrier beads (made of glass or similar non-conductive material) is then poured over the surface of the document from one side to the other. The beads, and excess toner, are captured on the lower edge of the device to be reused. This process can be repeated several times in order to develop all areas of the document.
  - Aerosol spray method: Some EDDs provide the ability to spray toner over the surface of the charging film. In these systems a protective shell or chamber is fitted that covers the entire platen. At one end there is a nozzle connected to a reservoir of toner. The examiner then manually activates a pump that sprays toner into the chamber creating a cloud of fine toner that settles down onto the surface of the charging film. Ideally the cloud is randomly distributed but often this method produces a relatively distinctive pattern of toner on the film.
  - Brush method: With some EDDs the toner is applied using a magnetic brush such as would be used for development of latent fingerprints. This is a manual process that is quite tedious and requires meticulous control of the brush. But the method works well for selective development of subtle indentations.
  - Toner pad method: Similar to the brush method described above but uses a special pad with a built-in toner reservoir. The toner pad is placed on the surface of the charging film and moved across the surface by hand.
- Assessment of results. After the development process is complete the examiner must assess the results of the test process.
  - FFU test results: since the questioned document may or may not have indentations, the correct method to assess the functionality of the EDD is through inspection of the FFU test sample.

  - If indentations are developed from the FFU test sample, the EDD can be considered as functioning correctly.
  - If no indentations developed from the FFU test sample, the EDD is not working.
  - If the FFU test was positive and no indentations are developed in the area of the questioned document, then the assessment will be that no detectable indentations have been developed. This does not mean the questioned document was never in contact with other items of interest. The absence of detectable indentations may be due to one or more limitations causing the indentations to not be detected.
  - Note that the presence of indentations in the document area is prima facie evidence that detectable indentations exist such that the FFU test is redundant.

- Preservation of results. It is important to record and/or preserve the results of a test, especially if the test is positive (i.e., indentations were developed). This can be done in at least two ways.
  - Adhesive lift: in this method, a sheet of fixing film is used to preserve the developed indentations. The fixing film is usually a relatively rigid sheet of self-adhesive, transparent polymer film. It is applied by removing the backing material and carefully laying the fixing film directly onto the charging film, thus trapping and fixing the toner in place between the films. Pressure is then carefully applied to the top of the fixing film by hand or with a small roller. The resulting sandwich is referred to simply as a "lift", or EDD lift. Interpretation of the developed indentations is generally done using the lift after removal from the document because this permits the examiner to see the developed indentations on their own without interference from any visible markings on the document.
  - Photography/scanning: the results may also be captured using a camera, either directly from the charging film or from the lift after removal from the document. Scanning is also an option but only when using the lift itself.

Aside from visualizing indentations, the method can be used to detect the presence of fresh fingerprints, fiber disturbance on the paper surface (e.g. relating to mechanical erasure of information), or the presence of footwear impressions on paper.

== Manufacturers ==
An EDD is a highly specialized device and there are only a few manufacturers:

1. Foster + Freeman Ltd manufactures and markets the ESDA® (from Electrostatic Detection Apparatus) which is the original such device developed in 1978. It was designed to meet the requirements of the UK Home Office and is still in production today in two different forms: the ESDA^{2}® and ESDA-Lite® (portable)
2. Projectina AG manufactures the Docustat DS-210 and DS-220
3. Lightning Powder Company, Inc. manufactures two units: the Electrostatic Vacuum Box and Vacu-Box™ for Indented Writing
4. Kinderprint (now CSI Forensic Supply) used to manufacture the IMEDD® (from Indentation Materializer Electrostatic Document Device) but their website no longer lists this device in their product line
