= Scientific Working Group =

Organisational structure for US forensic scientists

Since the early 1990s, American and International forensic science laboratories and practitioners have collaborated in Scientific Working Groups (SWGs) to improve discipline practices and build consensus standards. In 2014, the SWGs are being reorganized under the NIST Organization for Scientific Area Committees (OSAC). SWGs are not limited to forensic science. They are common in many other fields.

As of January 2012, active SWGs included the following:

- FISWG - Facial Identification Scientific Working Group
- SWGANTH - Forensic Anthropology
- SWGCBRN - Chemical, Biological, Radiological and Nuclear
- SWGDAM - DNA Analysis
- SWGDE - Digital Evidence
- SWGDMI - Medicolegal Death Investigation
- SWGDOC - Questioned Documents
- SWGDOG - Dogs and Orthogonal Detection
- SWGDRUG - Analysis of Seized Drugs
- SWGDVI - Disaster Victim Identification
- SWGFAST - Latent Fingerprints
- SWGFEX - Fire and Explosives Scenes
- SWGGEO - Geological Materials
- SWGGSR - Gunshot Residue
- SWGGUN - Firearms and Toolmarks
- SWGIBRA - Illicit Business Records
- SWGIT - Imaging Technologies
- SWGMAT - Materials Analysis
- SWGSTAIN - Bloodstain Pattern Analysis
- SWGTOX - Toxicology
- SWGTREAD - Footwear and Tiretracks
- SWGWILD - Wildlife Forensics

Each SWG includes scientists working within the field of focus. Although a couple of the above-listed SWGs have only American members, most of the groups have international members. Federal, state or local government forensic laboratory scientists are the most common SWG members, but many SWGs also include other experts such as private laboratory scientists, academia, independent consultants, attorneys and judges.

Most SWGs have public websites with discipline-specific resources including approved and drafts for comment standards, best practices guidelines and related documents.
