= Canadian Society of Forensic Science =

Canadian professional association

- Abbreviation: CSFS
- Formation: October 16, 1953; 73 years ago
- Purpose: Professional non-profit organization for forensic science
- Headquarters: Ottawa, Ontario, Canada
- Region served: Canada; Worldwide
- Members: 425
- Official language: English; French
- President: Dianna Polley
- Main organ: Executive Committee
- Website: www.csfs.ca

The Canadian Society of Forensic Science (CSFS; French: La Société Canadienne des Sciences Judiciaires) is a professional association aimed at maintaining professional standards and promoting and enhancing the study and stature of forensic science. Membership in the society is open internationally to professionals with an active interest in the forensic sciences.

== History ==
The CSFS was founded on October 16, 1953, in Ottawa, Ontario, Canada. The founding members were William Wallace Sutherland, Charles George Farmilo, James Alexander Churchman, Blake B. Coldwell, and Leo Levi. The society officially became a non-profit corporation on April 10, 1963, with the signing of the Letters Patent under the authority of the Companies Act.

== Present structure ==
The CSFS has an Executive Committee consisting of elected Officials and a Board of Directors. In addition there are several standing and special committees, including Awards, Finance, Membership, Nominating, Publication, Accreditation, Alcohol Test, Constitution, Drugs and Driving, and Informatics/Education.

The CSFS is further organized into sections representing diverse areas of forensic science, as follows:

- Anthropology, Medical and Odontology
- Biology
- Chemistry
- Documents
- Engineering
- Firearms
- Toxicology

There are six types of membership in the society: Regular, Fellow, Emeritus, Provisional, Associate and Student. As of May 2022, the society had 425 members of all types.

== Journal ==
The society publishes the peer-reviewed, quarterly Journal of the Canadian Society of Forensic Science. It is devoted to the publication of original papers, comments, and reviews in all branches of forensic science, as well as other matters of forensic interest ( e.g., social sciences, law enforcement and/or jurisprudence). Abstracts from 1995 to the present are available online at the CSFS website.

== Conference ==
The society holds a regular professional conference and Annual General Meeting. The location, specific dates, and themes vary each year.

In 2025, the conference was held at the Centre of Forensic Sciences in Toronto, Ontario, Canada. The conference theme was “The Power of Forensics”.

== Awards ==
The society gives out the following awards:

- Rita Charlebois Award, to provide financial assistance to a deserving candidate(s) to attend scientific meetings
- CSFS Memorial Award, to posthumously commemorate the contributions to forensic science in Canada of society members who have died
- CSFS Education Award, an annual award for promoting the field of forensic science
- The Derome Award, to honour those individuals who had been active in the establishment of the profession in Canada
- H. Ward Smith Award, to commemorate the contribution to forensic science in Canada of the late H. Ward Smith.

== See also ==
- Canadian Identification Society
- Forensics
