= Journal of Forensic Sciences =

- Discipline: Forensic science
- Language: English
- Edited by: Michael Peat

Publication details
- History: 1956-present
- Publisher: Wiley-Blackwell on behalf of the American Academy of Forensic Sciences
- Frequency: Bimonthly
- Impact factor: 1.832 (2020)

Standard abbreviations
- ISO 4: J. Forensic Sci.

Indexing
- CODEN: JFSCAS
- ISSN: 0022-1198 (print); 1556-4029 (web)

Links
- Journal homepage; Online archive

The Journal of Forensic Sciences (JFS) is a bimonthly peer-reviewed scientific journal, and is the official publication of the American Academy of Forensic Sciences, published by Wiley-Blackwell. It covers all aspects of forensic science.

== Abstracting and indexing ==
The journal is abstracted and indexed in:

- Abstracts in Anthropology
- Abstracts on Hygiene & Communicable Diseases
- EBSCO databases
- ProQuest databases
- Biological Abstracts
- BIOSIS Previews
- CABDirect
- Chemical Abstracts Service
- Current Contents/Clinical Medicine
- GeoRef
- Global Health
- Index Medicus/MEDLINE/PubMed
- InfoTrac
- METADEX
- PsycINFO/Psychological Abstracts
- PSYNDEX
- Science Citation Index
- Scopus
- The Zoological Record

According to the Journal Citation Reports, the journal has a 2020 impact factor of 1.832.
