= American Society of Questioned Document Examiners =

- Formation: September 2, 1942; 84 years ago
- Purpose: Professional non-profit society for forensic document examiners
- Headquarters: Long Beach, CA, United States
- Region served: International
- Official language: English
- President: Thomas W. Vastrick
- Main organ: Executive Committee
- Website: www.asqde.org

The American Society of Questioned Document Examiners (ASQDE) is the world's oldest society dedicated to the forensic science of questioned document examination with 99 members worldwide. The current president is Thomas W. Vastrick. The society publishes the Journal of the American Society of Questioned Document Examiners twice a year.

== Membership ==
Membership in the society is open to any practising questioned document examiner who meets the criteria for membership according to the by-laws.

There are nine classes of membership in the society: Regular Members, Provisional Members, Associate Members, Affiliate Members, Corresponding Members, Life Members, Life Corresponding Members, Honorary Members, and University Students. Examiners from the United States or Canada are eligible to become Regular members while examiners from other countries are considered to be Corresponding members.

== History ==
In 1913, Albert S. Osborn of New York City invited Elbridge Stein of Pittsburgh to discuss questioned document examination issues beginning the earliest days of the society. J. Fordyce Wood of Chicago, J. Frank Shearman of Wichita, Kansas, and John J. Lomax of Montreal, were invited in the years immediately following. John F. Tyrrell of Milwaukee, WI, began attending early meetings and Albert D. Osborn, the son of Albert S. Osborn, attended in 1919 upon returning from service overseas during World War I. Herbert J. Walter of Winnipeg, Manitoba, Canada, was later invited in 1926 and within the next two years, Edwin H. Fearon of Pittsburgh, PA, Harry E. Cassidy of Richmond, MI, and Scott E. Leslie of Cleveland, OH, joined the group.

James Clark Sellers of Los Angeles, CA was invited and attended the 1930 meeting. At that meeting, Rafael Fernandez Ruenes of Havana, Cuba, also attended. In 1931, John L. Harris of Los Angeles, CA was asked to join. In the meantime, George Walter (son of Herbert J. Walter) became a member. Elwin C. Leslie (son of Scott E. Leslie) attended and participated in the 1939 meeting. George J. Lacy, Houston, TX, was invited and first attended in 1942 as did, Warren T. Johnson. Other names have been relegated to obscurity because of a lack of interest or inability to participate in the rigorous contributory program.

Membership was entirely by invitation and the organization remained informal up until this time. Its meetings were completely educational in scope and annual attendance, as well as full participation in the program, were a requirement for subsequent invitation.

On September 2, 1942, it was decided to formalize the organization and it became known as The American Society of Questioned Document Examiners, its current name.

== Presidents ==
The following persons have been presidents of the society:

- Albert S. Osborn 1942-1946
- James Clark Sellers 1946-1950
- Albert D. Osborn 1950-1952
- John L. Harris 1952-1956
- George J. Lacy 1956-1960
- Ordway Hilton 1960-1962
- David A. Black 1962-1964
- Donald B. Doud 1964-1966
- John J. Harris 1966-1968
- Lucile P. Lacy 1968-1970
- David J. Purtell 1970-1972
- Linton Godown 1972-1974
- Philip L. Schmitz 1974-1976
- Joe Nemecek 1976-1978
- John C. Shimoda 1978-1980
- David A. Crown 1980-1982
- Charles C. Scott 1982-1984
- Maureen Casey-Owens 1984-1986
- John F. McCarthy 1986-1988
- James V. P. Conway 1988-1990
- Paul A. Osborn 1990-1992
- Gideon Epstein 1992-1994
- Ronald M. Dick 1994-1996
- Roy A. Huber 1996-1998
- Robert J. Muehlberger 1998-2000
- Diane K. Tolliver 2000-2002
- Grant R. Sperry 2002-2004
- Dan C. Purdy 2004-2006
- Howard C. Rile, Jr. 2006-2008
- Farrell C. Shiver 2008-2010
- Linton A. Mohammed 2010-2012
- James A. Green 2012-2014
- John Paul Osborn 2014-2016
- Jason Lee Miller 2016-2018
- F.L. "Jim" Lee, Jr. 2018-2020
- Samiah Ibrahim 2020-2022
- Samiah Ibrahim 2022-2024 (re-elected)
- Thomas W. Vastrick 2024-2026
