= Canadian Who's Who =

Canadian publication of self-verified biographies

Canadian Who's Who is a publication containing biographical information about 13,000 notable Canadians. Because of the absence of biographical fact-checking by the publishers (e.g. candidates send in their own biographical details without any checking), Canadian Who's Who is not used as a reference by mainstream Canadian media, and is rarely, if ever, quoted as a source, according to a journalist listed in the publication.

== Background ==
Canadian Who's Who is published and distributed annually by Grey House Publishing Canada with a bright-red binding and an online searchable version is also available through a subscription. The online, searchable, electronic version of Canadian Who's Who includes more than 11,000 archived biographies, in addition to the 13,000 biographies found in the 2014/2015 print edition. Every year the publisher invites new individuals to complete questionnaires from which new biographies are compiled. The publisher also gives those already listed in earlier editions an opportunity to update their biographies.

Canadian Who's Who was first published in 1910 by the Ottawa branch of The Times. In a rare reference to Canadian Who's Who in Canadian media, the Peterborough Examiner in 2009 found reading the 1910 edition to be "as rewarding as similar time spent surfing the web". In 1932, A.L. Tunnell acquired copyright from The Times and published a second edition in 1936. Tunnell usually published new editions every three years. University of Toronto Press became the new publisher in 1978 and began an annual schedule of publication. In 1997 it began publishing on CD-ROM. Third Sector Publishing took over from University of Toronto Press in March 2011, publishing editions up to 2015, before Grey House Publishing purchased the publication in March 2016.

There is no charge, nor is there any obligation, for the inclusion of a biography in the Canadian Who's Who but according to Elizabeth Lumley, a former editor of the publication, entrants must be outstanding in their field. Included are Canadians from business, academia, politics, sports, the arts and sciences.

In 1997, Canadian journalist Robert Fulford wrote that "Canadians chosen for inclusion submit their own entries, at whatever length they choose, and no one edits their egotism or whimsy". Fulford described the publication as "a book of 15,000 authors". In April 2018, Canadian Who's Who made a rare appearance in mainstream Canadian media in Maclean's, regarding the falsification of Canadian author Bill Gaston's biographical details.
