= International Fingerprint Research Group =

The International Fingerprint Research Group (IFRG) is forensic identification researcher group that gather together to exchange scientific knowledge in forensic identification.

The IFRG is regrouping the most active researchers in the world in the forensic identification field and was founded in September 1974. IFRG conferences are attended through personal invitations only.

== Foundation and principles ==
The International Fingerprint Research Group (IFRG) is regrouping every second year to discuss and investigate various aspects of fingermark evidence, including development techniques and fingerprint identification. The IFRG strives to gather together researcher under the Gordon Research Conferences principles, encouraging formal and informal exchanges, where international representatives present and discuss frontier research in the biological, chemical, and physical sciences, and their related technologies. It also support integration of young scientist in the field.

== Conferences ==
- 1974 - London, UK
- 1984 - London, UK
- 1987 - Quantico, USA
- 1988 - Washington D.C., USA
- 1991 - Washington D.C., USA
- 1993 - Washington D.C., USA
- 1995 - Ne’urim, Israel
- 1996 - Hertfordshire, UK
- 1999 - Ottawa, Canada
- 2001 - Naurod, Germany
- 2003 - Hertfordshire, UK
- 2005 - The Hague, The Netherlands
- 2007 - Canberra, Australia
- 2009 - Lausanne, Switzerland
- 2011 - Linköping, Sweden
- 2013 - Jerusalem, Israel
- 2015 - Patiala, India
- 2017 - Beijing, China
- 2019 - Sheffield, UK
- 2021 - Postpone COVID
- 2023 - The Hague, Netherlands

== Documentation produced ==
The IFRG produce the following documentation:

- “Guidelines for the Assessment of Fingermark Detection Techniques,” Journal of Forensic Identification, vol. 64, pp. 174–200, 2014.

== See also ==
- Forensics
