= Canadian Identification Society =

- Société Canadienne de l'Identité
- SCI/CIS logo
- Formation: 13 November 1977
- Type: Professional non-for-profit fellowship
- Purpose: For forensic identification specialists
- Members: > 800
- Official language: English; French
- Website: www.cis-sci.ca

The Canadian Identification Society (CIS) is a bilingual (English–French) professional non-for-profit fellowship of police officers and civilian members who share interests and employment in crime scene investigation. Also known in French as Société Canadienne de l'Identité (SCI).

Although the Society is mainly a Canadian organization including more than eight hundred (800) members through Canada, it also gathers members of the United States of America, Australia, United Kingdom as well as others international communities.

== Creation ==
The CIS was officially created under Part II of the Canada Corporations Act on November 13, 1977, following the signature of the Letters Patent. The founding members of the CIS were:

- Lloyd Dunham
- Christopher D. Tiller
- Howard Hall
- Clayton Bigras
- Roger Remillard
- Richard Jordon
- Allen Wrenshall
- Donald Braithwaite
- Harold G. Tuthill
- Donald Guttman
- Ronald Duck

== Mission and goals ==
The Canadian Identification Society (CIS) is a professional association for those engaged in forensic identification, investigation, and scientific examination of physical evidence.

The CIS supports continuing research in all areas of forensic science and aims to keep members informed and current by providing excellent training opportunities and links to educational resources. It has served its members by encouraging forensic identification specialists to share their knowledge and experience.

== President list ==
- Christopher D. Tiller (1977–1978)
- Scott J.J. Raybould (1978–1979)
- C.F. Cecil Brown (1979–1980)
- Donald Nelson (1980–1981)
- William R. Pryde (1981–1982)
- Archie G.A. Purgavie (1982–1983)
- John E. Duncan (1983–1984)
- S.H. (Sim) Wentzell (1984–1985)
- Robert L. Bridgewater (1985–1986)
- Kenneth J. Collier (1986–1987)
- William Donald Dixon (1987 - +)
- Spencer M. Hilton (1987–1988)
- Ross E. Reed (1988–1989)
- Donald F. Taylor (1989–1990)
- H. Gregg McKinnon (1990–1991)
- James R. McConnell (1991–1992)
- Anthony J. Bouwmeester (1992–1993)
- Janet N. Holt (1993–1994)
- Ronald E. Yeomans (1994–1995)
- Herbert J.M. Durand (1995–1996)
- Bryan Amos (1996–1997)
- J.D. Bert Hudon (1997–1998)
- Robert B. Kennedy (1998–1999)
- Brent Walker (1999–2000)
- Scott Brown (2000–2001)
- Henry Kinsella (2001–2002)
- John P. (Pat) Downey (2002–2003)
- Glen Saunders (2003–2004)
- Mary Beeton (2004–2005)
- Grant Boulay (2005–2006)
- Paul Gagnon (2006–2007)
- Shelly Massey (2007–2008)
- Alexandre Beaudoin (2008–2009)
- Matthew Lewandowski (2009–2010)
- Stuart Wyatt (2010–2011)
- Wade Knaap (2011–2012)
- Shawna Laird (2012–2013)
- John Aitkenhead (2013–2014)
- Dwayne Raymond (2014–2016)
- Jessica Piekny (2016–2018)
- Tamryn Loy Son (2018–2022)
- Tiffany deLeon (2022–2024)

+ = Deceased while president

== Awards ==
=== The Tiller Award ===
Christopher D. Tiller, one of the founding members of the CIS, created the Tiller Award for CIS members who have demonstrated excellence in law enforcement photography. This award is offered on an annual basis. Only members in good standing with the CIS are eligible to apply.

Recipients:

- Archie G.A. Purgavie
- Brian Ward
- Angus Noseworthy
- Kenneth Lugg
- David Zauner
- Carey Smith
- David Banks
- Wayne Harnum
- David E. Black
- Gary Leydier
- Al Misner
- David J. Hamer
- Alexander D. McMurrich
- Douglas Handy
- Ronald M. Gilbert
- Leonard B. Shaw
- Robert B. Kennedy
- Joseph Slemko
- W. Derrick Swiderski
- William B. Benjamin
- Suki Thind
- Michael Reid
- Sharon Smith
- John D. Stewart
- Alexandre Beaudoin
- Bruce Hamblin
- Grant Boulay
- Denis P. Turcotte

=== The Edward Foster Award ===
This award is named after Edward Foster, the founder of the fingerprint system in Canada, and is intended to encourage CIS members to conduct research that shall benefit the Forensic Identification profession. This award point out the great contribution of the recipient to Forensic Identification field in his career.

Recipients:

- Brian E. Dalrymple
- Harold G. Tuthill
- Robert A. McPherson
- Jack Milligan
- Maurice E. Wolff
- Paul Morin
- David Ashbaugh
- Robert B. Kennedy
- Pat Laturnus
- Maurice Nadeau
- Alexandre Beaudoin
- Della Wilkinson
- Rick Devine

=== The William Donald Dixon memorial research and essay Awards ===
William Donald Dixon, one of the founding members of the Canadian Identification Society, created two research awards, each in the amount of Can$500.00, for individuals engaged in forensic research.

Recipients:

- John Badowski (1989)
- Byron Ferguson (1990)
- David Ashbaugh (1991)
- Ron Yeomans (1994)
- Tara Nicholls (2000)
- Zain Bhaloo (2009)
- Requell Weisbrod (2011)

=== The Michael J. Cassidy Award ===
Michael J. Cassidy made significant contributions to footwear comparison and identification. This award is intended to encourage professionalism and innovation in footwear evidence recovery and identification, by recognizing excellence in footwear comparison. Only members in good standing with the CIS are eligible to apply.

Recipients:

- Wayne Harnum
- Don Hulsman
- Rob Gervais
- Shelly Massey
- Bruce Hamblin

=== The Jack Milligan achievement Award ===
Jack Milligan is one of the early founding members of the Canadian Identification Society. Three awards, in the amount of $500.00, $300.00 and $200.00 (Canadian), are available for CIS members that have been recognized by their peers for their outstanding achievements in the field of fingerprints. The award can be cash, a voucher, or can be put toward a sponsorship to attend a future Annual Educational CIS Conference.

Recipients:

- RCMP – Ottawa Latent Fingerprint Bureau
- Bradley J. Butler
- CIS Friction Ridge Certification Committee (John Aitkenhead, Shawna Laird, Jean Séguin, Ralph Gutoskie)

== Journal ==
The organisation's quarterly publication, Identification Canada, is a peer-reviewed 40-page colour Journal. This journal is, for the most part, bilingual. It is a means of distributing findings on hi-tech methods and ideas from both technological and scientific fields of the forensic sciences, as well as, a venue for communicating training opportunities and the business of the Society.

Editors

- Lloyd Dunham (1977–1978)
- Ivan Brown (1978–1979)
- L.M. Schulhauser (1979–1981)
- Jack Milligan (1981–1989)
- Neala Taylor (1989–2002)
- Della Wilkinson (2002–2012)
- Wade Knaap (2012–2023)
- Jessica Piekny (2023 - )

== Annual Educational Conference ==
Each year, the Canadian Identification Society provides a venue which brings together persons in the forensic professions. This Annual Educational CIS Conference is held by police forces of a different city in Canada.

- 1978 – Ottawa – Royal Canadian Mounted Police/Canadian Police College
- 1979 – Regina – Regina Police Service
- 1980 – Peterborough - Peterborough Police Department
- 1981 – Vancouver – Vancouver Police Department
- 1982 – Montreal – Service de police de la Ville de Montréal
- 1983 – Calgary – Calgary Police Service
- 1984 – St-John's – Royal Newfoundland Constabulary
- 1985 – Winnipeg – Winnipeg Police Service
- 1986 – Burlington – Halton Regional Police Service
- 1988 – Toronto Metro – Toronto Police Service
- 1989 – Edmonton – Edmonton Police Service
- 1990 – Capital Region - 9 Dept's
- 1991 – Saint John - Saint John Police Department
- 1992 – Hamilton - Hamilton-Wentworth Regional Police Service
- 1993 – Vancouver – Vancouver Police Department
- 1994 – Windsor - Windsor Police Department / Michigan-Ontario Identification Association
- 1995 – Halifax – Royal Canadian Mounted Police
- 1996 – Orillia – Ontario Provincial Police
- 1997 – Edmonton – Edmonton Police Service
- 1998 – Kitchener – Conestoga College
- 1999 – Fredericton – Royal Canadian Mounted Police
- 2000 – Vancouver - Delta Police Department
- 2001 – Ottawa – Ottawa Police Service
- 2002 – Mississauga – University of Toronto Mississauga
- 2003 – Ottawa - Canadian Identification Society / International Association for Identification
- 2004 – St-John's – Royal Newfoundland Constabulary
- 2005 – Calgary – Calgary Police Service
- 2006 – Windsor – University of Windsor / Canadian Society of Forensic Science / Canadian Identification Society
- 2007 – Montreal – Sûreté du Québec
- 2008 – Halifax – Atlantic Canada Death Investigators / Canadian Society of Forensic Science / Canadian Identification Society
- 2009 – Vancouver - British Columbia Institute of Technology / New Westminster Police Service
- 2010 – Orillia – Ontario Provincial Police
- 2011 – Ottawa – Royal Canadian Mounted Police
- 2012 – Calgary - Calgary Police Service
- 2013 – Richmond, B.C. - Canadian Identification Society
- 2014 – Toronto - Canadian Identification Society

== See also ==
- Forensics
