= International Association for Identification =

The International Association for Identification (IAI) is the largest forensic organization in the world. It was originally formed as the International Association for Criminal Identification in October 1915. Through the years it has grown into an educational and certification body with over 6,000 members worldwide.

== Missions ==
The International Association for Identification strives to be the primary professional association for those engaged in forensic identification, investigation, and scientific examination of physical evidence. To accomplish this mission, it has six goals:

- Educate members about the most current information and research in forensic identification.
- Affiliate people who are actively engaged in the profession of forensic identification, investigation, and scientific examination of physical evidence in an organized body. In this way, the profession may be standardized, as well as effectively and scientifically practiced.
- Enlarge and improve the science of forensic identification and crime detection.
- Encourage research in scientific crime detection.
- Employ the collective wisdom of the profession to advance the scientific techniques of forensic identification and crime detection.

== Presidents ==
- Harry H. Caldwell, Oakland, CA (1915-1921)
- A.J. Renoe, Leavenworth, KS (1921-1923)
- Charles C. Carmody, Detroit, MI (1923-1925)
- Dr. J. G. Duncan, Oklahoma City, OK (1925-1926)
- Maurice B. O’Neal, New Orleans, LA (1926-1927)
- William Robert Ellis, Houston, TX (1927-1928)
- H.A. Thompson, Oklahoma City, OK (1928-1929)
- James R. Wilkerson, Windsor, ON, Canada (1929-1930)
- Harold W. Axtell, Denver, CO (1930-1931)
- Edward A. Parker, Memphis, TN (1931-1932)
- B.T. Andrews, St. Joseph, MO (1932-1933)
- Edward F. Burke, Rochester, NY (1933-1934)
- T.P. Sullivan, Chicago, IL (1934-1935)
- William A. Toler, Richmond, VA (1935-1936)
- Elias W. Hoagland, St. Louis, MO (1936-1937)
- Arthur H. Muchow, Sioux Falls, SD (1937)
- William C. Gordon, Kansas City, MO (1937-1938)
- William E. Cashin, Bella Vista Village, AR (1938-1939)
- W. Paul Whitley, Raleigh, NC (1939-1940)
- Edward Lorrain, Montreal, QC, Canada (1940-1941)
- Thomas A. Dwyer, Detroit, MI (1941-1942)
- Marie Grott Morrissey, Indianapolis, IN (1942-1943)
- Robert E. Moore, Detroit, MI (1943-1944)
- J. Earl Scroggin, Little Rock, AR (1944-1945)
- L. Clark Schilder, Arlington, VA (1945-1946)
- Oscar J. Digert, Milwaukee, WI (1946-1947)
- William A. Winfield, Rochester, NY (1947-1948)
- R.W. Nebergall, Arnprior, ON, Canada (1948-1949)
- Glen H. McLaughlin, Austin, TX (1949-1950)
- Frank V. Chameroy, Hartford, CT (1950-1951)
- George L. Beckvermit, Denver, CO (1951-1952)
- Paul D. McCann, Albany, NY (1952-1953)
- George A. Kanz, Salem, OR (1953-1954)
- Lawrence A. Kelly, Charlotte, NC (1954-1955)
- Daniel d’Andrieu, LaSalle, QC, Canada (1955-1956)
- Eric Ekebom, Rockford, IL (1956-1957)
- Robert M. Vollmer, Miami, FL (1957-1958)
- Edward J. Moellering, Houston, TX (1958-1959)
- Birk C. Harl, Evansville, IN (1959-1960)
- James F. Shumate, Denver, CO (1960-1961)
- Vincent B. Hurlbut, West Hartford, CT (1961-1962)
- James E. Devery, Chicago, IL (1962-1963)
- Walter G. Hoetzer, Utica, NY (1963-1964)
- C. Lester Trotter, Treasure Island, FL (1964-1965)
- Fred R. Rymer, Austin, TX (1965-1966)
- John W. Tyler, Perry, FL (1966-1967)
- Leslie W. Williams, New London, CT (1967-1968)
- Albert W. Somerford, Hempstead, TX (1968-1969)
- Bayne W. Linden, Sioux City, IA (1969-1970)
- John D. Douthit, St. Paul, MN (1970-1971)
- Jay R. Jensen, Denver, CO (1971-1972)
- Owen W. Byers, Evansville, IN (1972-1973)
- Farrell D. Babcock, East Grand Rapids, MI (1973-1974)
- Joseph M. Wallace, Pittsburgh, PA (1974-1975)
- George J. Fagan, Madison, CT (1975-1976)
- Joseph J. Musial, Miami, FL (1976-1977)
- Emery B. Morel, Springfield, LA (1977-1978)
- Donald G. Mooney, Shanks, WV (1978-1979)
- Ernest Jensen, Seattle, WA (1979-1980)
- C. Stanley Kimball, Phoenix, AZ (1980-1981)
- Richard L. Brunelle, Ormond Beach, FL (1981-1982)
- Kay J. McClanahan, Columbia, SC (1982-1983)
- John J. Spann, Jr., New Orleans, LA (1983-1984)
- H. A. Albert, Austin, TX (1984-1985)
- Robert T. Grant, Pensacola, FL (1985-1986)
- Clarence E. Phillips, Dumfries, VA (1986-1987)
- Douglas M. Monsoor, Ormond Beach, FL (1987-1988)
- Charles J. Jacobs, Crawfordville, FL (1988-1989)
- Charles A. Moss, Sr., Decatur, GA (1989-1990)
- James T. Murray, Orlando, FL (1990-1991)
- Robert E. Prouty, Sacramento, CA (1991-1992)
- Curtis M. Shane, Brunswick, GA (1992-1993)
- Joseph P. Polski, St. Paul, MN (1994)
- Marilyn R. Nault, Seattle, WA (1995)
- Danny Hasty, Chipley, FL (1996)
- Ronald C. Jackson, Gloucester, ON, Canada (1997)
- Charles P. Illsley, West Valley City, UT (1998)
- James B. Gettemy, Tallahassee, FL (1999)
- Ann D. Punter, Ontario, CA (1999-2000)
- Robert C. Sanders, Wausau, WI (2000-2001)
- Richard Fahy, Overland Park, KS (2001-2002)
- Steve Nash, Petaluma, CA (2002-2003)
- Janice M. Johnson, Pensacola, FL (2003-2004)
- Robert B. Kennedy, Orleans, ON, Canada (2004-2005)
- Joe M. Maberry, Dallas, TX (2005-2006)
- Diana M. Castro, Whittier, CA (2006-2007)
- Kenneth F. Martin, Boston, MA (2007-2008)
- Robert J. Garrett, Mutuchen, NJ (2008-2009)
- Vici K. Inlow, Reston, VA (2009-2010)
- Philip Sanfilippo, Doral, FL (2010-2011)
- R. Kevin Lawson, St. Louis, MO (2011-2012)
- Deborah Leben, Washington, DC (2012-2013)
- Lesley C. Hammer, Anchorage, AK (2013-2014)
- Steven L. Johnson, Clarksburg, WV (2014-2015)
- Bridget Lewis, St Charles, IA (2015-2016)
- Harold Ruslander, Port Charlotte, FL (2016-2017)
- Raymond A. Jorz, Painesville, OH (2017-2018)
- Lisa Hudson, Wauwatosa WI (2018-2019)
- Ken Zercie, Madison, CT (2019-2021)
- Dr.Alexandre Beaudoin, Montreal, QC, Canada (2021-2022)
- John Grassel, Lincoln, RI (2022-2023)
- Domingo Villarreal, TX (2023- )

== Awards ==
=== John A. Dondero Memorial Award ===
The award is presented to an Active Member of the Association, who have made "the most significant and valuable contribution in the area of identification and allied sciences." The laureates are:

- 1959- Hoover, J. Edgar; Washington, DC
- 1960- Cashin, William E.; Albany, NY
- 1969- Mooney, Donald G.; Washington, DC
- 1970- Musial, Joseph; Miami, FL
- 1972- Brunelle, Richard L.; Washing, DC
- 1973- Nash, Ernest W.; East Lansing, MI
- 1974- MacDonell, Herbert L.; Corning, NY
- 1975- McCann, Paul; Albany, NY
- 1976- Given, Bruce; Falls Church, VA
- 1978- Johnson, Robert L.; Annandale, VA
- 1980- Dalrymple, Brian E.; Toronto, Ontario
- 1982- Hazen, Robert J.; Quantico, VA
- 1985- Kendall, Frank G.; Atlanta, GA
- 1988- Domingo, Frank; New York, NY
- 1989- Lee, Dr. Henry C.; Meriden, CT
- 1997- Sampson, William C.; Miami, FL
- 2001- Smith, Ron; Meridian, MS
- 2002- Taylor, Karen T.; Austin, TX
- 2004- Masters, Nancy E.; St. Helen's, OR
- 2006- Bodziak, William J.; Palm Coast, FL
- 2007- Meagher, Stephen B.; Quantico, VA
- 2008- Ashbaugh, David; British Columbia, Canada
- 2013- McRoberts, Alan; Temecula, California
- 2014- Margot, Pierre; Lausanne, Switzerland
- 2016- German, Edward; Newington, VA
- 2017- Yamashita, Brian; Ottawa, ON Canada
- 2021- Springer, Eliot; Flushing, NY
- 2022- Hamm, Ernest; Fleming Island, FL

=== Dr Antonio A. Cantu Memorial Award for Early Career Research ===
The award is to be awarded at the discretion of the Board of Directors to a new forensic science practitioner and active member of this association, to highlight the creativity, originality, professionalism, and innovation of his research in the recovery and identification of forensic evidence, in the early stages of his career.

=== Good of the Association Award ===
This award recognize an individual who, "in the opinion and judgment of the IAI's Board of Directors, is deemed to have made an "outstanding contribution to the Association." The laureates are:

- 1987- Nielson, John P.
- 1988- Bonebrake, George
- 1989- Fiorenza, Tom
- 1990- Saviers, Kathleen D.
- 1991- Crooker, Rosella O.
- 1993- Carrick, Michael F.; Grieve, Rhoda M. and Murray, James T.
- 1994- Gettemy, James B. and Neuner, John K.
- 1995- Grieve, David L.; Hahn, Timothy F. and Stryker, Henry
- 1996- Martin, Charles E. and Sanders, Robert C., III
- 1997- Carrick, Michael F.; Fiorenza, Tom; Murray, Candy; Shane, Curtis M. and Shane, Mathea
- 1998- Douthit, John D. and Hamm, Ernest D.
- 1999- FBI, Laboratory Division; Illsley, Charles P. and Ostermeyer, Donald C.
- 2000- Chapman, Carey
- 2001- Ashbaugh, David; German, Edward R.; Meagher, Steven B. and Punter, Ann D.
- 2002- Murray, Candy; Polski, Joseph P. and Smith, Norman R.
- 2004- Nash, Steven
- 2005- Parkinson, Gregory A.
- 2006- Garrett, Robert J.
- 2008- Leben, Debbie
- 2009- Brown, King C.; Watkins, Dawn
- 2010- Honeycutt, Dennis
- 2011- Martin, Kenneth
- 2012- Inlow, Vici
- 2014- Hicklin, Austin
- 2017- Johnson, Steve; Witzke, David
- 2019- Hilderbrand, Dwane
- 2022- Hullihan, Mike
- 2023- Griffin, Thomas

=== Distinguished members ===
Distinguished membership may be conferred only on a Member by a majority vote of the I.A.I. Board of Directors in recognition of the Member's superior efforts in the furtherance of the aims and purposes of the I.A.I. A Distinguished Member retains all the rights, privileges, and obligations of the class of membership he or she held prior to being designated as a Distinguished Member.

- 1987 - Bonebrake, George J.
- 1987 - Hamilton, James L.
- 1987 - Leadbetter, Martin J.
- 1987 - Lee, Henry
- 1987 - Monsoor, Douglas M.
- 1987 - Phillips, Clarence E.
- 1988 - Berg, Stanton O.
- 1988 - Nielson, John P.
- 1988 - Smith, Norman R.
- 1989 - Grieve, David L.
- 1989 - Hamm, Ernest D.
- 1989 - Jungbluth, William O.
- 1989 - Moore, Raymond T.
- 1989 - Morgan, Marvin L.
- 1989 - Olson, Robert D. Sr
- 1989 - Saviers, Kathleen D.
- 1990 - Watling, William J.
- 1990 - Wertheim, Pat A.
- 1991 - Ashbaugh, David R.
- 1992 - Sahs, Paul T.
- 1993 - Carrick, Michael F.
- 1994 - Chapman, Carey L.
- 1994 - Koenig, Bruce E.
- 1995 - Hall, Richard F.
- 1995 - Masters, Nancy E.
- 1995 - Sampson, William C.
- 1996 - Timothy F. Hahn
- 1996 - Hilderbrand, Dwane S.
- 1997 - Shonberger, M. Frank
- 1998 - Olenik, John
- 1998 - Vernon, Wesley
- 1999 - Fahy, Richard E. M.
- 2001 - Wertheim, Kasey
- 2004 - Czarnecki, Eugene R.
- 2004 - Hare, Karen R.
- 2004 - Maceo, Alice
- 2004 - Parkinson, Gregory A.
- 2005 - Vanderkolk, John R.
- 2006 - Moore, Craig C.
- 2006 - Stimac, Jon T.
- 2007 - Black, John
- 2007 - Byrd, Jon
- 2007 - German, Edward R.
- 2007 - Langenburg, Glenn
- 2008 - Bevel, V. Thomas
- 2008 - Bodziak, William J.
- 2008 - Klasey, Darrell
- 2008 - Onstwedder, John
- 2008 - Ramotowski, Robert S.
- 2009 - Cantu, Antonio A.
- 2009 - Hammer, Lesley C.
- 2009 - Leben, Deborah
- 2009 - Perkins, Michael
- 2009 - Polski, Joseph P.
- 2010 - Knaap, Wade W.
- 2010 - Martin, Kenneth F.
- 2010 - Springer, Eliot
- 2011 - Beaudoin, Alexandre
- 2011 - Cooney, Lauren
- 2011 - Dalrymple, Brian E.
- 2011 - Triplett, Michelle
- 2012 - Duncan, Christopher
- 2014 - Laskowski, Gregory
- 2014 - Johnson, G. Matt
- 2014 - Sanfilippo, Philip
- 2014 - Curtit, Jean
- 2015 - Brown, King
- 2015 - Ruslander, Harold
- 2015 - Schenck, Rodney
- 2015 - Siegel, Sandra
- 2015 - Watkins, Dawn
- 2016 - Griffin, Tom
- 2016 - Latham, Holly
- 2016 - Neumann, Cedric
- 2017 - Lemay, Jan
- 2017 - Shane, Curtis
- 2018 - Johnson, Steve
- 2019 - Bright-Birnbaum, Kathleen
- 2021 - Greene, Stephen
- 2021 - Eldridge, Heidi
- 2021 - Hudson, Lisa
- 2021 - Brazelle, Mack
- 2022 - Jorz, Ray
- 2022 - Villarreal, Domingo

=== Dedication to Service Award ===
The Dedication to Service Award is awarded to individuals who have shown outstanding dedication over time to the Association and its objectives. The laureates are:

- 2005- McLaughlin, Glen
- 2006- Arend, Jim
- 2008- Reed, Roy
- 2011- Parker, Charles
- 2011- Weaver, David
- 2012- Lewis, Bridget
- 2012- Klasey, Darrell
- 2015- Vernon, Wesley
- 2016- Calhoun, Glen
- 2021- Bush, James
- 2022- Hammer, Lesley
- 2023- McRoberts, Alan

== Training ==
There are four means of obtaining training through the IAI:

- IAI Sponsored Training Opportunities
- IAI Division Conferences
- International Education Conference
- Vendor/Supplier and Private Training

== Certification boards ==
There are eight (8) certifying boards:

- Bloodstain Pattern Analysis Certification
- Crime Scene Certification
  - Level I -- Certified Crime Scene Investigator
  - Level II—Certified Crime Scene Analyst
  - Level III—Certified Senior Crime Scene Analyst
- Footwear Certification
- Forensic Art Certification
- Forensic Photography Certification
- Latent Print Certification
- Tenprint Fingerprint Certification
- Tiretrack and Footwear Certification

The International Association for Identification also participates in Scientific Working Groups (SWGs).

The organization's monthly publication is the Journal of Forensic Identification.

== See also ==
- Forensic science
