= American Academy of Forensic Sciences =

Professional society based in Colorado Springs, Colorado, U.S.

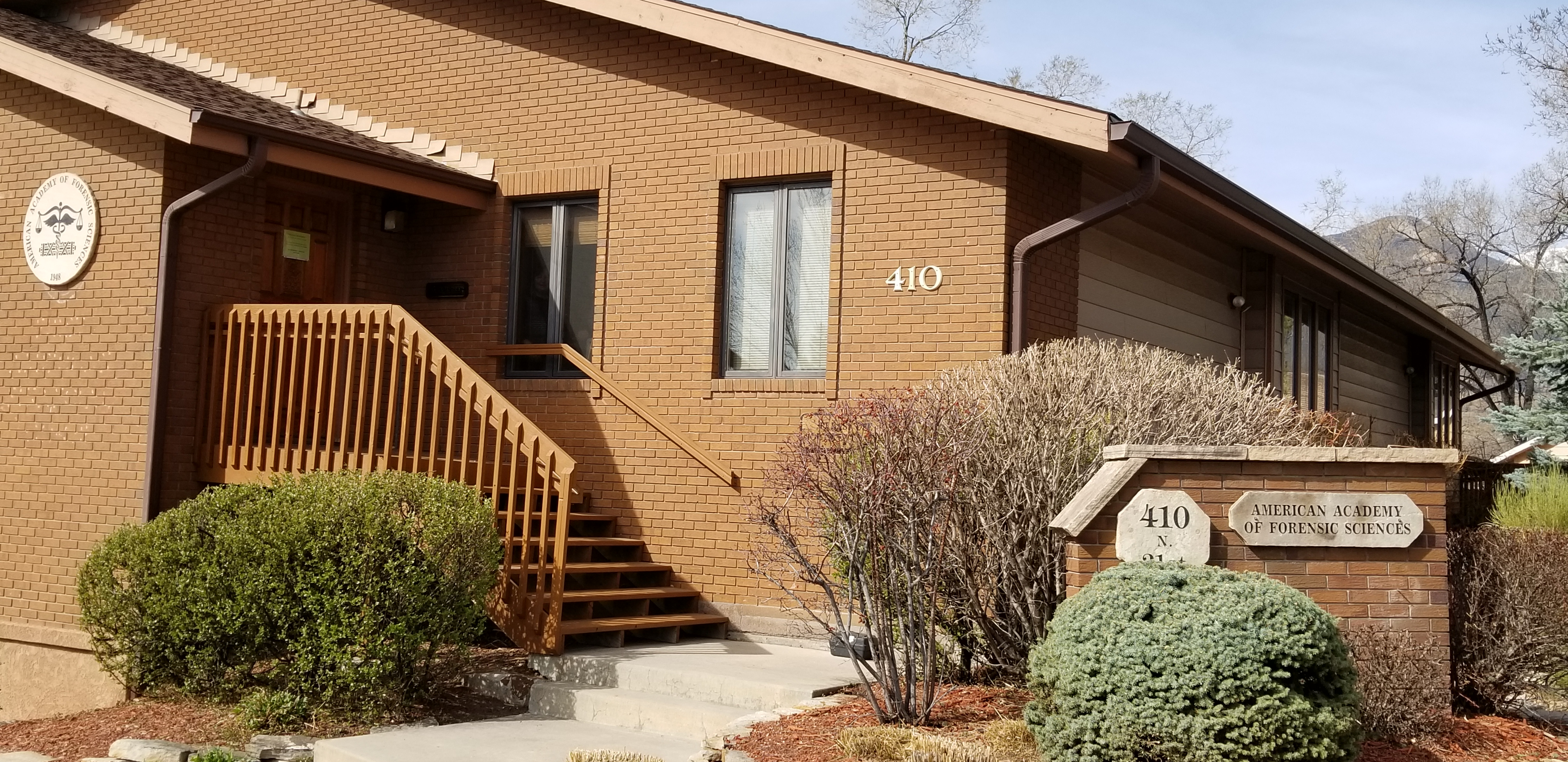
- Abbreviation: AAFS
- Formation: January 18, 1948; 78 years ago
- Purpose: Professional non-profit organization for forensic science
- Location: Colorado Springs, Colorado, USA
- Region served: USA, international
- Official language: English
- President: Joanna Collins, MFS (2025-26)
- Main organ: Executive Committee
- Website: http://www.aafs.org

The American Academy of Forensic Sciences (AAFS) is a society for forensic science professionals, and was founded in 1948.

The academy is based in Colorado Springs, Colorado, USA. The AAFS is a multi-disciplinary professional organization that provides leadership to advance science and its application to the legal system. Despite the name, the AAFS has members from over 70 countries, and has included presidents from Canada and the Netherlands. The objectives of the AAFS are to promote professionalism, integrity, competency, education, foster research, improve practice, and encourage collaboration in the forensic sciences. The AAFS has established several other organizations to further professionalism within the forensic sciences, including the Forensic Science Education Programs Accreditation Commission (FEPAC) to accredit collegiate forensic science education programs, and the Academy Standards Board (ASB) to develop and promulgate standards for areas of the forensic sciences without a separate standards body.

The AAFS provided consultancy on the development of CSI: The Experience, a traveling exhibition about crime lab forensic science and technology inspired by the television series CSI: Crime Scene Investigation. The society consist of different sections in the branches of Anthropology, Criminalistics, Digital & Multimedia Sciences, General, Engineering & Applied Sciences, Jurisprudence, Odontology, Pathology/Biology, Psychiatry & Behavioral Science, Questioned Documents, and Toxicology.

The official journal of the AAFS is the Journal of Forensic Sciences is published by Wiley-Blackwell. The mission of the JFS is to advance forensic science research, education and practice by publishing peer-reviewed manuscripts of the highest quality. These publications will strengthen the scientific foundation of forensic science in legal and regulatory communities around the world.

== Past Presidents (since 1980) ==
- Joanna Collins, MFS (2025-26)
- Christopher R. Thompson, MD (2024-25)
- C. Ken Williams, MS, JD (2023-24)
- Laura C. Fulginiti, PhD (2022-23)
- Carl R. McClary, MS (2021-22)
- Jeri D. Ropero-Miller, PhD (2020-21)
- Zeno J. Geradts, PhD (2019-20)
- Susan M. Ballou, MS (2018-19)
- Betty Layne DesPortes, JD, MS (2017-18)
- John E. Gerns, MFS (2016-17)
- Victor W. Weeden, MD (2015-16)
- Daniel A. Martell, PhD (2014-15)
- Barry K. Logan, PhD (2013-14)
- Robert E. Barsley, DDS, JD (2012-13)
- Douglas H. Ubelaker, PhD (2011-12)
- Joseph P. Bono, MA (2010-11)
- Thomas L. Bohan, PhD, JD (2009-10)
- Carol E. Henderson, JD (2008-09)
- Bruce A. Goldberger, PhD (2007-08)
- James G. Young, MD (2006-07)
- Edmund R. Donoghue, MD (2005-06)
- Ronald L. Singer, MS (2004-05)
- Kenneth E. Melson, JD AAFS CFSO Liaison (2003-04)
- Graham R. Jones, PhD (2002-03)
- Mary Fran Ernst, BLS (2001-02)
- John D. McDowell, DDS, MS (2000-01)
- Patricia J. McFeeley (1999-2000)
- Barry A.J. Fisher, MS, MBA (1998-99)
- Michael A. Peat, PhD (1997-98)
- Richard Rosner, MD (1996-97)
- Haskell M. Pitluck, JD (1995-96)
- Steven C. Batterman, PhD (1994-95)
- Enrico N. Togneri, BA (1993-94)
- Marina Stajic, PhD (1992-93)
- Homer R. Campbell, Jr., DDS (1991-92)
- Ellis R. Kerley, PhD (1990-91)
- Richard C. Froede, MD (1989-90)
- Richard S. Frank, BS (1988-89)
- Yale H. Caplan, PhD (1987-88)
- Don Harper Mills, JD, MD (1986-87)
- Arthur D. Goldman, DMD (1985-86)
- Maureen Casey Owens, AB (1984-85)
- George E. Gantner, MD (1983-84)
- Anthony Longhetti, BA (1982-83)
- Joseph H. Davis, MD (1981-82)
- Lowell J. Levine, DDS (1980-81)
- June K. Jones, MS (1979-80)
