= Surveillance art =

Type of art concerning surveillance

Surveillance art is the use of technology intended to record human behavior in a way that offers commentary on the process of surveillance or the technology used to surveil. Surveillance art manifests itself in many different forms, from short films to architecture, but all have been shown to provide some type of critical response to the rise of surveillance by various authorities and the technology used to achieve it, especially when dealing with issues of security and enforcing laws.

== History ==
With new technology, came new surveillance and new ways of responding to it through artistic media. With the advent of video-recording devices, closed circuit television, and digital cameras, remote surveillance of subjects became possible. One of the most popular figures to adapt these new methods of surveillance to art was Andy Warhol.

Warhol's movie Outer and Inner Space introduced the performance-art possibilities of high-tech surveillance to the modern world. At the same time, it provided the observed subject with the image or knowledge of being observed, in this case the actress Edie Sedgwick. "On the left, Sedgwick's video image, in full profile, gazes off to the right, looking up as if she were talking to someone standing above her. On the right, the 'real' (or 'live') Edie sits in three-quarter profile facing left, addressing someone sitting off-screen to the left of Warhol's movie camera—an arrangement which at times creates the illusion that we are watching Sedgwick in conversation with her own image."

In the late twentieth century, the AIDS epidemic, cancer rates, and other health concerns created a new form of surveillance. Suddenly, the condition of the human body and potential for contagion became an addition to existing systems of observation.

"The 'my body, my business' ideal in the clinical setting dovetailed with broader societal concerns about snoops, spies, and surveillance, setting the stage for a fundamental recasting of the politics of surveillance in the last decades of the twentieth century. The encounter over HIV represented the high water mark of patient participation in the politics of surveillance. "

=== Post modern ===
The terrorist attacks of September 11, 2001, sparked a new wave of American surveillance of bodies. This was primarily a form of electronic information gathering—monitoring of phones and email, Internet use, tracking and tracing of cell phones and GPS units. In certain instances, the detaining and/or monitoring of U.S. citizens of various ethnicities compounded the already growing debate on the violation of civil liberties. In July 2006, Mary DeRosa, a Senior Fellow of the Center for Strategic and International Studies, testified at a congressional hearing on the Foreign Intelligence Surveillance Act. At this point, different organizations within the United States government had been applying separate acts to monitor perceived threats of foreign agents, sometimes at cross-purposes and with varying degrees of rights violation.

DeRosa stated: "The national security agencies and their employees are charged with protecting the United States from harm. When faced with a decision about whether to take a step that invades liberties they will not always be able to judge whether it is the only way or the best way to address a problem -- or whether it is simply the easiest way."

As homeland security issues forced questions of the infringement of civil liberties, the response of various practitioners of surveillance art questioned the notion of privacy. In one of the most notorious cases, the price of innocence and freedom seems to be the willing sacrifice of one's personal privacy.

The case of Hasan Elahi has also addressed new technologies in surveillance: tracking and tracing of cell phones, the capabilities of GPS technology, and worldwide Internet access by both the observer and the observed. The relationship between the watcher and the body watched becomes an impetus to the artwork itself.

Elahi has stated of his art: "Both quantitative and qualitative information is incorporated into my work, and the entire process results in translations and mistranslations between the physical and the virtual, between the body politic and the singular citizen. The mutual misunderstandings that inevitably occur provide the inertial energy for the continuing activity and effectiveness of the work."

=== Futurist ===
The latest evolution of response to surveillance systems is to become the system. New forms of biometric surveillance—such as heart rate monitors, and facial recognition software—are being utilized for personalized experiences and amusement park rides. With the development of neuroimaging technologies, some artists have begun to explore the brain as a performance space in regards to neural surveillance.

Beyond biometrics is the integration of cybernetic technology into surveillance art. The Canadian filmmaker, Robert Spence, has adapted a miniature camera into his prosthetic eye. In an odd reversal, Spence has finally come full circle with the concept of surveillance art: '"Originally the whole idea was to do a documentary about surveillance. I thought I would become a sort of super hero … fighting for justice against surveillance," Spence said. "In Toronto there are 12,000 cameras. But the strange thing I discovered was that people don't care about the surveillance cameras, they were more concerned about me and my secret camera eye because they feel that is a worse invasion of their privacy."

== Popularized areas ==
=== Performance ===
On May 3, 2008, artists Robin Hewlett and Ben Kinsley staged a simulated street scene in a Pittsburgh neighborhood when the Google Street View team came through. They named the project "Street with a View" which they describe as introducing "fiction, both subtle and spectacular, into the doppelganger world of Google Street View." Using an array of local residents and actors, scenes included a marathon, a parade, a garage band practice, firemen rescuing a cat, and a sword fight. This was one of the first instances where Google Street View had been used as a means of art, specifically as surveillance art.

The Surveillance Camera Players (SCP), based in New York City and founded by Bill Brown, are one of the main innovators of this art form. This group of actors stages various plays in public spaces, their first one being Alfred Jarry's "Ubu Roi" on December 10, 1996, at the 14th Street-Union Square Subway station. They have performed other famous works such as Samuel Beckett's Waiting for Godot, Edgar Allan Poe's The Raven, George Orwell's Nineteen Eighty-Four and Animal Farm. Their plays are staged in very public places such as subway stations, Times Square, Rockefeller Center, Washington Square Park, Union Square, and various other landmarks throughout the city. Their primary purpose is to create a public spectacle in order to get people to question the role surveillance plays in their lives. These performances may be witnessed by the public, yet the actual recordings of these performances remain inaccessible. The SCP is said to have been inspired by the anti-surveillance manifesto, "Guerilla Programming of Surveillance Equipment," but state that they were not the first to stage surveillance camera theater. They state that it was the invention of comedy writers:

Properly speaking, surveillance camera theater was invented by a comedy writer, not a privacy advocate or a performance artist: i.e., the person(s) who in 1981 wrote the "On the Job" episode of the American TV sit-com Taxi, in which Alex Reiger (played by Judd Hirsch) temporarily gets a job as a camera-watching security guard. Bored out of his mind by the isolation and silence, Alex eventually learns to pass the time by improvising silly little skits in front of the surveillance camera and watching himself on the monitor at the same time. When Alex's shift is over, he is replaced by a veteran of the place (played by "Grampa" Al Lewis), who pulls out a ventriloquist's dummy and starts performing in front of the surveillance camera as soon as his shift begins! The implication was that every security guard – when no one (else) was looking – was passing the time in this way.*

On 12 October 1992, Saturday Night Live included a skit that imagined that during the night, when everyone else had gone home, the people who worked at Rockefeller Center – not just the security guards, but also the cleaning ladies and the maintenance workers – would amuse themselves and each other by putting on little skits in front of the building's surveillance cameras. As in Taxi, none of these skits had any political content and none of them concerned privacy rights. (In June 1996, a skit called "Security Camera Theatre" aired on Late Night with David Letterman, but we haven't been able to see it or to find a synopsis of it. Given the conservatism of Letterman's show, we doubt that this skit deviated from the pattern set down by Taxi and SNL.)

— From outside the closed circuit: the antecedents of surveillance camera theater, http://www.notbored.org/

The SCP has a wide following around the world and has even spawned sister groups in Arizona, California, Italy, Lithuania, Sweden, and Turkey suggesting how the issue of surveillance is one which transcends nationalities and cultures, bringing people together to make one synonymous public statement. However, they say that although they are flattered that they inspire others, they are rarely impressed by the work that is created. Their complaint is that in the videos that are created, the artists usually end up promoting "several of the primary ideological supports for generalized surveillance." These works of art fail to connect their audiences to the everyday people who are being watched.

=== Architectural ===
Some surveillance artists choose to use architecture as canvases. The buildings and structures they use are in highly visible areas with many pedestrians. The artists install a surveillance system that tracks human movement through or around the structure. The system is connected to a viewing format, such as a large screen or light installation, which are triggered by human movement. As one artist describes it, "All the visual elements in the projection result from people's movements through the space." Surveillance art elicits interaction from viewers while making them more aware of the pervasiveness of surveillance.

Some architectural surveillance art pieces involve large screen installations or projections on highly visible buildings in populated areas. Artist Christian Moeller's 2006 project, "Nosy," includes a street-level camera which records the active surrounding environment, including pedestrians, cars, and a nearby train in Osaki City, Japan. The real-time video is "displayed in bitmap graphics [and projected] onto three towers covered with white LEDs behind frosted glass panels."

Artist Camille Utterback created a similar installation in 2007, called "Abundance," using the domed city hall of San Jose, California, as her interactive canvas. The installation includes a large surveillance camera focused on pedestrians and an abstract art animation, projected onto the city hall building. Pedestrians' location and movement within the field of the camera are translated into abstract shapes that appear in the projection. As the pedestrian moves, the corresponding shape moves within the animation and interacts with other shapes in the projection. Utterback's website states, "Movements and paths through the plaza become part of a collective visual record, and transform the building into a playful and dynamic canvas."

The Los Angeles-based artist team, Electroland, has been dedicated to working on interactive art projects. Many of their projects are architectural surveillance art through the use of light installations or electronic displays. One of their architectural installations, "Enteractive," uses both the inside and outside of a building in Los Angeles. This project, finished in 2006, involves tracking indoor participants' movements and locations over a large floor light grid. Outside, their real-time locations and movement patterns are broadcast to anyone within view of the colored light grid installed onto the face of the building.

Another of Electroland's projects was incorporated into the Pedestrian Bridge of the Indianapolis Airport in 2008. The project, named "Connection," is made up of light "dots" that cover the length of the bridge, which light up in different colors as people pass through. The colored dots follow people's movements and often interact with participants, "exhibit[ing] a range of intelligent and playful behaviors, accompanied by sounds." Electroland has similar projects, including Target Breezeway, Lumen, and Drive By.

The French art team, Hehe, also works with architectural surveillance art but they prefer to take a "green" approach. Like Electroland, they have also done light installations, like their 2007 project in Luxembourg, "Grandes Lignes." This project includes light installations along a pedestrian footbridge that only light up where a pedestrian is located. Hehe describes the selective lighting as "the personal light sphere, which surrounds the traveler as they move from one end to the other." Hehe explains the intent behind the project: "The responsiveness of the system functions ecologically and economically – saving energy – and also metaphorically: Your shadow – of light – walks with you and follows you."

Hehe has also started a set of projects under the title, "Pollstream," all of which are environmentally-focused. Of these, Nuage Vert, or "green cloud" in English, is architectural surveillance art. The 2008 project uses a thermo-sensitive camera and a laser with a green, cloud-shaped beam. Installed on a nearby building, the beam is projected onto the stream of pollution from a power plant in Helsinki, as a constant reminder to residents of their energy usage. Hehe's focus in this project moves from direct surveillance of people to the surveillance of their factories and plants. Here, humans are being indirectly watched through what they produce, like air pollution. This is potentially the beginning of a move into air surveillance art.

=== Inverse surveillance/sousveillance ===
Inverse surveillance, or "sousveillance", makes use of surveillance technology such as cameras from the perspective of the participant, allowing the object of surveillance essentially to become the subject. The term sousveillance was coined by media artist Steve Mann.

Typical instances of sousveillance as art involve voluntarily recording and broadcasting one's own activities (via webcam, for example). The expressed purpose for this, in some cases, is to take away the value of the knowledge of the artist's whereabouts and current activity. Hasan Elahi, an interdisciplinary media artist who was falsely suspected of terrorism and detained by government authorities, has said that the goal of broadcasting his daily life is to devalue information about him since "Intelligence agencies, regardless of who they are, all operate in a market where their commodity is information, and the reason their information has value is because no one else has access to it." Thus, by increasing access to the information, he is taking away the surveilling authority's monopoly on it.

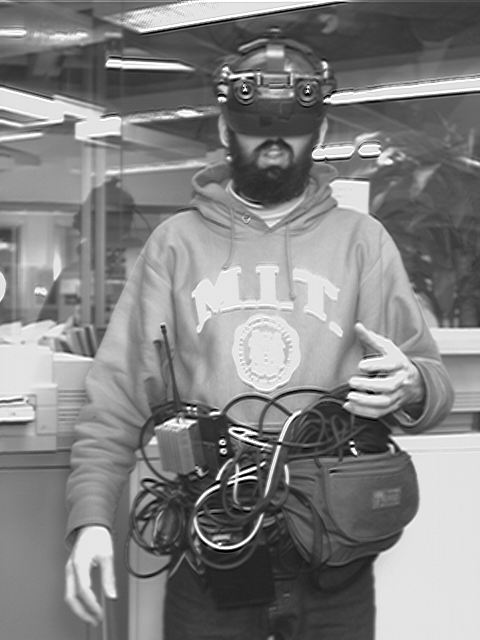
Steve Mann wears a wireless web cam.

== Critical responses ==
Scholars in the fields of surveillance studies and performance studies have become increasingly interested in interpreting surveillance art. The most comprehensive treatment of surveillance art to date is Elise Morrison's book Discipline and Desire, which provides a valuable compendium of many theater, performance, and art installations focused on surveillance. Morrison argues that surveillance art is especially effective at pushing audiences to imagine alternatives to oppressive forms of surveillance in society. Aligned scholars have also examined surveillance art performances in great detail but have developed specific criteria for evaluating whether interventions are merely enticing or truly transformative. For instance, James M. Harding has insisted that art should not shy away from affronting viewers and doing physical damage to undermine surveillance-enabled political corruption and police violence. Torin Monahan has similarly argued that effective anti-surveillance artworks are those that explicitly confront white privilege and disrupt racialized violence and discrimination.

As the field of surveillance studies has grown with the addition of critical humanities scholarship, treatments of surveillance art have become more frequent. The journal Surveillance & Society, which publishes academic articles and creative work on surveillance, now offers an "Arts Forum" section and regularly includes pieces on surveillance art. Some publications in the journal have called for greater attention to surveillance art's entertainment capacity and pedagogical affordances; others have explored artworks that hijack pervasive surveillance systems to call attention to issues of privilege, agency, and subjectification; still others use video installations to critique surveillance-driven digital platforms that support precarious "gig" work. Beyond what is published in Surveillance & Society there are also many books that offer overviews—or selective criticisms—of surveillance art. Finally, in recognition of the importance of artistic and aesthetic interventions into surveillance, the Surveillance Studies Network (the academic association that publishes Surveillance & Society), has featured plenary panels on surveillance arts at its conferences and has established an Arts prize.

== Notable examples ==
These examples are representative of surveillance art's methods and effects. Although they use different technologies and tactics, they are united by an interest in the increasing prevalence of surveillance in modern society, and its effects on citizens and communities.

- Wireless Intelligent Systems Laboratory, directed by Stephen Wicker, and Human-Computer Interaction Group, headed by Geri Gay, created a surveillance art experiment, wherein the movements of visitors at the Herbert F. Johnson Museum of Art are tracked by cameras. Their movements are coordinated, and influence a soundtrack created by professional sound designer Ron Riddle.
- Digital Urban Living and the Digital Aesthetics Research Center hold a conference titled "Sousveillance: The Art of Inverse Surveillance" from February 8-9th, 2009, in Denmark. "Sousveillance", a term coined by Steve Mann, "denotes bringing the practice of observation down to human level (ordinary people doing the watching, rather than higher authorities or architectures doing the watching)."
- Benjamin Males has created several surveillance art projects, including:
  - the Target Project, wherein images of people are analyzed to determine and store their racial data, which Males says "exists to critique and raise questions about legislation and the use of surveillance on the public."
  - SOLA, or The Statistic Obesity Logging and Apparatus, a system that can roughly determine an individual's Body Mass Index via surveillance images.
- Since being detained while entering the US, Hasan Elahi has been required to notify an FBI agent of his location whenever he traveled. Elahi decided to make this information available to the public, documenting his every move on his Web site, even via pictures. He also has published his complete banking records.
- Christian Moeller has worked on several projects regarding surveillance, including:
  - "Mojo," a robotic arm holding a spotlight. Pedestrians walking in San Pedro, California were taped on video cameras and then followed by the spotlight.
  - "Nosy," a camera that randomly recorded people and then displayed them in bitmap graphics on nearby buildings.
  - Moeller describes himself as, "an artist working with contemporary media technologies to produce innovative and intense physical events, realized from handheld object to architectural scale installations.
- Artist Camille Utterback uses a video camera in San Jose, California to monitor people, whose movements are translated into animated graphics and projected on to a 3-story rotunda.
- Designer Jason Bruges has created several large-scale examples of surveillance art:
  - Bruges Studio surveyed the movement of commuters on the London Bridge and projected it as a matrix of colors on the top of the **Tower Bridge, located a few blocks away. Bruges also made his system capable of searching out those on the Bridge with Bluetooth connections and projected a color unique to each connection on the Tower Bridge.
  - Bruges studio created "smart" street lamps in Leicester, England that could recreate the colors of passing cars.
  - "Real-time tracking and information gathering will only get more sophisticated," he says. "I think it's very important to subvert these technologies and use them in a playful way so people become less scared and more comfortable with this technology that already surrounds them."
- YouTuber Surveillance Camera Man (or SurveillantCameraMan) has several videos which have received hundreds of thousands of views. He is an anonymous male who films unsuspecting people in Seattle. He rarely speaks and never shows his face in his videos, instead choosing to focus his camera on random people and film their reactions to being recorded in public. The reactions are often hostile. He occasionally brings up the fact that many stores have surveillance cameras which tape customers. He often responds to his angry victims by saying that he has the right to film people in public, even without permission.
- In the video installation titled "Image Blockade," artists Ruti Sela and Maayan Amir explore the intersection of visual, political, and legal issues through an fMRI experiment that scans the brain activity of veterans from Israeli intelligence units, as a means of masking their identity while reflecting on questions related to unethical surveillance tactics, censorship, insubordination, and the effects of information blocking on sensory perception. The artwork employed this visual strategy as a way of observing information that is beyond the scope of censorship tools and usage while invoking further questions of privacy of sensation.
- Adam Rifkin's 2007 film "Look" is shot entirely from surveillance footage, and questions the effect constant surveillance has on our everyday lives. Rifkin describes the film as about "the things we people do when we don't think we're being watched."
