= David Lyon (sociologist) =

Retired Scottish sociologist

David Lyon FRSC FAcSS
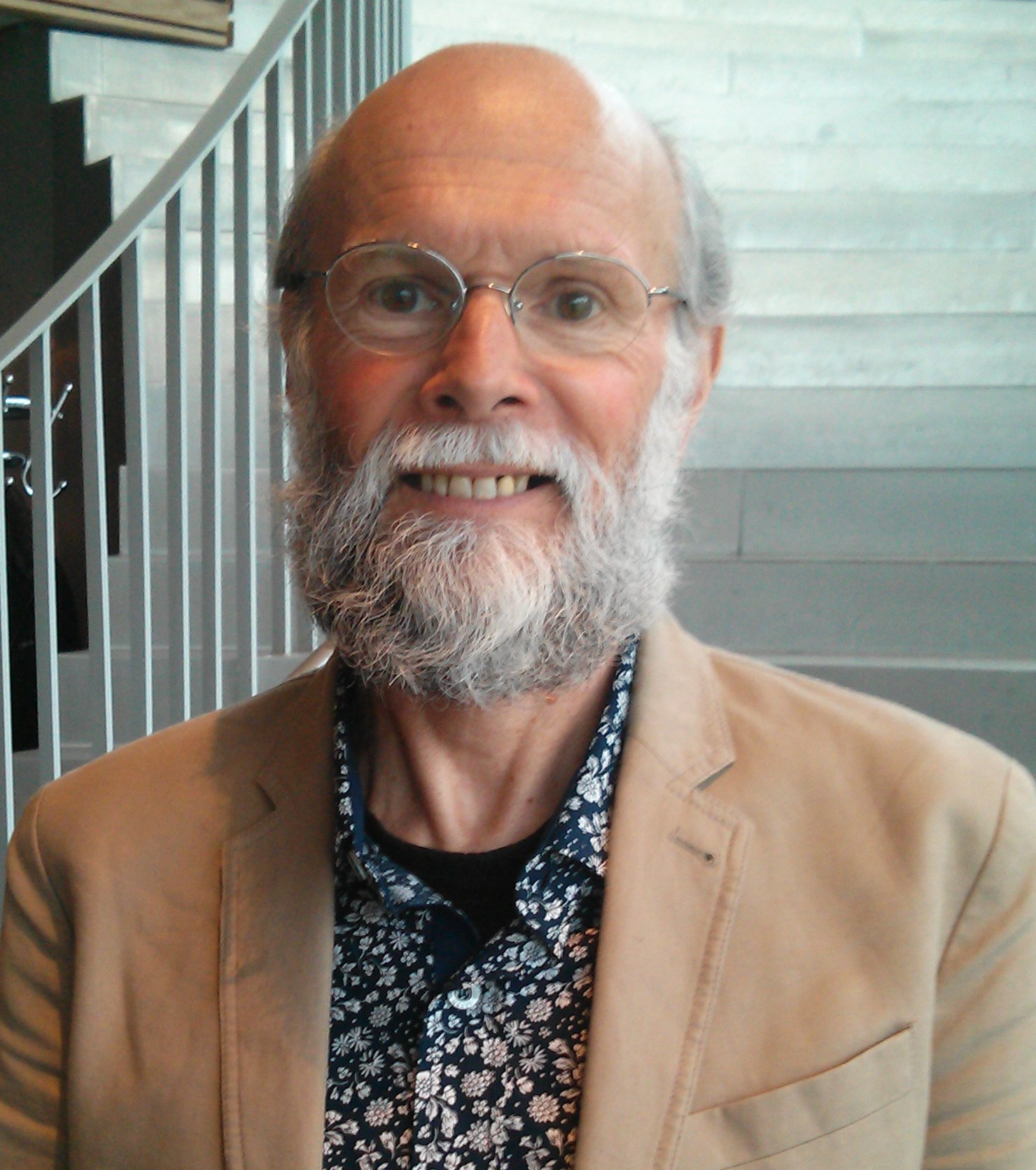
- Lyon in 2015
- Born: 1948 (age 77–78); Edinburgh, Scotland

Academic background
- Education: University of Bradford
- Thesis: The Eclipse of Christian-Religious Assumptions (1976)
- Influences: Charles Taylor

Academic work
- Discipline: Sociology
- Institutions: Queen's University
- Main interests: Secularity; surveillance
- Notable ideas: Social sorting

David Lyon FRSC FAcSS (born 1948) is a sociologist who directed the Surveillance Studies Centre at Queen's University in Kingston, Ontario. He previously held a Queen's Research Chair position and appointments in the Department of Sociology and the Faculty of Law at Queen's University.

Born in Edinburgh, Scotland, Lyon received Bachelor of Science and Doctor of Philosophy degrees in social science and history at the University of Bradford in Yorkshire, England, fuelling a fascination with driving forces behind and social consequences of some major transformations of the modern world.

Lyon defines surveillance as the "operations and experiences of gathering and analyzing personal data for influence, entitlement or management." As well, he has developed key concepts in the field, such as social sorting. Lyon has also taught and researched in the areas of information society, globalization, secularization, and postmodernity. He is author, co-author, editor or co-editor of 32 books. His books have been translated into 19 languages.

He was a founding editor of the journal Surveillance & Society, is an associate editor of The Information Society, and is on the international editorial board of a number of other academic journals. Since 2000 Lyon has led a series of team projects; currently, "Big Data Surveillance" (2015–2020). He is also on the international advisory boards of other major projects in surveillance studies.

He has held visiting appointments in a number of universities including Auckland, Bir Zeit, Edinburgh, Leeds, Melbourne, Sydney, Rio de Janeiro, Tokyo, the Centre for Social and Economic Change, Bangalore, and the École des Hautes Études en Sciences Sociales, Paris. Lyon has also encouraged surveillance research initiatives and groups around the world, especially in Israel/Palestine and the Middle East, Japan, and Latin America.

== Sociology, religion, the secular ==
Lyon's dissertation focused on the historical sociology of belief-change in Victorian England and his early work explored the mutual relations of Christian social thought and the social sciences in works such as Karl Marx: A Christian Appreciation of his Life and Thought (1979) and Sociology and the Human Image (1983).

The Steeple's Shadow: On the Myths and Realities of Secularization (1986), questioned theories which suggest that religious belief and practice decline with the coming of modernity. Locally, he wrote a parish study of St James' Anglican church, Kingston; Living Stones (1995).

Jesus in Disneyland (2000) investigated the ways in which religious activities are affected by the so-called postmodern turn, and the co-edited (with Marguerite Van Die) Rethinking Church, State and Modernity: Canada between Europe and America (2000) examined the question from the perspective of political sociology. The latter research was funded by the Pew Charitable Trusts.

Lyon has contributed to the debate over the "post-secular" both directly, for example in "Being post-secular in the social sciences: Charles Taylor's social imaginaries" New Blackfriars, 91: 648-662, 2010 and indirectly, in "Surveillance and the Eye of God" Studies in Christian Ethics, 27(1): 21-32, 2014.

== Surveillance, technology, digital modernity ==
During the 1980s Lyon examined how new technologies are involved in social change and offered a balanced assessment in books such as The Information Society: Issues and Illusions (1988).

In a short book on Postmodernity (1994) he suggested that currently fashionable theoretical debates had to be understood in relation to social changes, especially the development of new media and the cultural prominence of consumerism. Today, he refers more to "liquid" and "digital" modernity.

Lyon's work on social aspects of new technologies concerns the processing of personal data. See The Electronic Eye: The Rise of Surveillance Society (1994). This blossomed into a research program that became increasingly collaborative, international and multi-disciplinary. Lyon's "social sorting" concept signals that while "privacy" is not to be minimized, broader questions of ethics and social justice, including civil liberties and human rights, are also prompted by the intensification of surveillance. This is seen even more starkly in a post-Snowden environment (see Surveillance After Snowden, 2015) where Big Data practices now play a central role (see "Snowden, surveillance and big data: capacities, consequences and critique" Big Data & Society, 1(1), 2014.

The argument of The Electronic Eye was complemented by Surveillance Society: Monitoring Everyday Life (2001) that focused on global developments and the increasing use of the body as a source of data, and then by Surveillance after September 11 (2003) that focuses on 9/11's role in expanding surveillance and diminishing human rights, capitalizing on fear, suspicion and secrecy. In the ironically titled Surveillance Studies: An Overview (2007) Lyon lays out dynamically the key features of surveillance studies.

== Identification, ethics, human flourishing ==
Identifying Citizens: ID Cards as Surveillance (2009) picked up on themes explored by Lyon since the late 1980s but also relating to more recent technical and political developments. The parallel volume here is the co-edited (with Colin Bennett) Playing the Identity Card: Surveillance, Security and Identification in Global Perspective (2008). Each book refers to Lyon's concept of the "card cartel" as a means of understanding the political economy of IDs at a time when "showing ID" has become a central – and novel – feature of social relations around the world.

Ethics has been integral to Lyon's work over many years, seen in his current work (e.g. "Liquid Surveillance: the Contribution of Zygmunt Bauman to Surveillance Studies" International Political Sociology, 4: 325-338, 2010 and Liquid Surveillance, co-authored with Zygmunt Bauman 2013). Today, says Lyon, more than ever, ethical questions demand attention because the issues are so large, urgent and intractable. While educational, legal, technical and other approaches are vital, he insists that it is also crucial both to confront the agents of surveillance and to consider current developments in terms of emerging political subjects, the common good and human flourishing.

== Criticism ==
Lyon's scholarship on surveillance has been criticized as drawing explicitly upon Christian beliefs to postulate that "caring" forms of surveillance are both possible and desirable. James M. Harding, in particular, has questioned whether this stance ultimately functions as an apology for abusive and corrupt surveillance practices by casting them as being in need of reform rather than eradication. Following the publication of Harding's critique in his book Performance, Transparency, and the Cultures of Surveillance, Lyon and Harding engaged in a published debate about these issues in the journal Surveillance & Society. Lyon contends that, while abusive and corrupt surveillance practices should indeed be eradicated, this does not mean that a surveillance of care doesn't exist or should not be aspired to.

== Recognition ==
- 2007 Lifetime Achievement Award American Sociological Association Communication and Information Technology Section
- 2008 Fellow of the Royal Society of Canada
- 2008–2010 Killam Research Fellow, the Canada Council's highest award
- 2012 Outstanding Contribution Award from the Canadian Sociological Association
- 2014 Fellow of the Academy of Social Sciences (UK)
- 2015 Insight-Impact Award from the Social Sciences and Humanities Research Council (SHRCC)
- 2016 Doctor honoris causa, Università della Svizzera Italiana, Switzerland
- 2018 Outstanding Contribution Award from the Surveillance Studies Network
- 2020 Molson Prize from the Canada Council for the Arts and SSHRC

== Selected works ==
- Lyon, David (June 1981). Karl Marx: A Christian Assessment of His Life and Thought. Intervarsity Press. ISBN 0-87784-879-3.
- Lyon, David (19 November 1983). Sociology and the Human Image. Downers Grove, Illinois: Inter-Varsity Press. ISBN 0-87784-843-2.
- Lyon, David (July 1986). The Silicon Society: How Will Information Technology Change Our Lives?. Grand Rapids, Mich.: W.B. Eerdmans Pub. Co. ISBN 0-8028-0238-9.
- Lyon, David (February 1987). The Steeple's Shadow: On the Myths and Realities of Secularization. Grand Rapids, Mich.: Eerdmans. ISBN 0-8028-0261-3.
- Lyon, D (1988). The Information Society: Issues and Illusions. Polity. ISBN 0-7456-0369-6.
- Lyon, D (1994). The Electronic Eye: The Rise of Surveillance Society. University of Minnesota Press. ISBN 0-8166-2515-8.
- Lyon, D (1996). Zureik, E (ed.). Computers, Surveillance and Privacy. University of Minnesota Press. ISBN 0-8166-2653-7.
- Lyon, D (1999). Postmodernity (2nd ed.). University of Minnesota Press. ISBN 0-8166-3227-8.
- Lyon, D (2000). Jesus in Disneyland: Religion in Postmodern Times. Polity. ISBN 0-7456-1489-2.
- Lyon, D (2001). Surveillance Society: Monitoring Everyday Life. Open University Press. ISBN 0-335-20546-1.
- Lyon, D. (15 December 2002). Surveillance as Social Sorting: Privacy, Risk and Digital Discrimination. Routledge. ISBN 0-415-27873-2.
- Lyon, D (26 September 2003). Surveillance After September 11. Polity. ISBN 0-7456-3181-9.
- Lyon, D. (2006). Theorizing Surveillance: The Panopticon and Beyond. Willan. ISBN 978-1-84392-191-2.
- Lyon, D (30 July 2007). Surveillance Studies: An Overview. Polity. ISBN 978-0-7456-3592-7.
- Lyon, D (2008). Bennett, C (ed.). Playing the Identity Card: Surveillance, Security and Identification in Global Perspective. Routledge. ISBN 978-0-203-92713-7.
- Lyon, D. (2009). Identifying Citizens: ID Cards as Surveillance. Polity. ISBN 978-0-7456-4156-0.
- Lyon, D (2010). Elia Zureik; Yasmeen Abu-Laban (eds.). Surveillance and Control in Israel/Palestine: Population, Territory, Power. Routledge. ISBN 978-0-415-58861-4.
- Lyon, D (2011). Aaron Doyle; Randy Lippert (eds.). Eyes Everywhere: The Global Growth of Camera Surveillance. Routledge. ISBN 978-0-415-69655-5.
- Lyon, D (2012). Kirstie Ball; Kevin Haggerty (eds.). Routledge Handbook of Surveillance Studies. Routledge. ISBN 978-0-415-58883-6.
- Lyon, D; Zygmunt Bauman (2013). Liquid Surveillance: A Conversation. Polity. ISBN 978-0-7456-6283-1.
- Lyon, D.; Bennett, Colin; Haggerty, Kevin; Steeves, Valerie, eds. (4 December 2014). Transparent Lives: Surveillance in Canada. Athabasca University Press. ISBN 978-1-927356-77-7.
- Lyon, David (17 August 2015). Surveillance after Snowden. Polity. ISBN 978-0-7456-9085-8.
- Lyon, David (2018). The Culture of Surveillance: Watching as a Way of Life. Wiley. ISBN 978-0-7456-7173-4.
- Lyon, David and David Murakami Wood (eds. 2021) Big Data Surveillance and Security Intelligence. University of British Columbia Press. ISBN 978-0-774-86418-3.
- Lyon, David (2021). Pandemic Surveillance. Wiley. ISBN 978-1-5095-5030-2.
- Lyon, David (2024). Surveillance: A Very Short Introduction. Oxford University Press. ISBN 978-0198796848.
