= Profile =

Profile or profiles may refer to:

== Art, entertainment and media ==
=== Music ===
- Profile (Jan Akkerman album), 1973
- Profile (Githead album), 2005
- Profile (Pat Donohue album), 2005
- Profile (Duke Pearson album), 1959
- Profiles (Nick Mason and Rick Fenn album), a 1985 album by Nick Mason and Rick Fenn
- Profiles (Gary McFarland album), a 1966 live album by Gary McFarland
- Profile (Misako Odani album), 1997
- Profile (Wolfe Tones album)

=== Film and television ===
- Profile (2018 film), a film directed by Timur Bekmambetov
- Profile (1954 film), a British thriller film
- Profile (1955 TV series) (1955–1957), a Canadian biographical television series
- Profiles (TV series) (1979–1980), a Canadian biographical television series
- Profile (2018 TV series), an American streaming television talk show

=== Other art, entertainment and media ===
- Profile (Marvel Comics), a Marvel Comics character
- Profile (novel), a 2009 novel by Chris Westwood
- "The Profile" (short story), a 1907 short story by Willa Cather

== Classification of individuals and groups of people ==
- Demographic profile, information about a person or market segment, commonly used in marketing. May also include photographic information (e.g., "profile picture")
- Investor profile, a classification of investor behavior
- Profile, a dossier of offender profiling data

== Computing and technology ==
- Profile (engineering), with several meanings in the context of engineering
- Profile (UML), a concept in Unified Modeling Language
- Apple ProFile, a hard drive
- FIS Profile, a banking transaction processing database engine
- ICC profile, used for colour management of computer displays and digital images
- User profile, refers to the computer representation of user information
- Profiling (computer programming), a form of performance analysis to investigate the behavior of a software program

== Other meanings ==
- Profile Books, a British independent publisher
- Profile portrait
- Profile Spotlight, a stage lighting fixture
- Strategy profile, a concept in game theory
- Old Man of the Mountain, a former rock formation in New Hampshire also known as the Profile
- a curved (molding) or plain fascia connecting surfaces, mostly decoratively, in architecture
- a genre of portrait art depicted from the perspective of the side

== See also ==
- Profiling (disambiguation)
- Low profile (disambiguation)
