= Blended artificial intelligence =

Blending of various AI techniques

Blended artificial intelligence (blended AI) refers to the blending of different artificial intelligence techniques or approaches to achieve more robust and practical solutions. It involves integrating multiple AI models, algorithms, and technologies to leverage their respective strengths and compensate for their weaknesses.

== Background ==
In the context of machine learning, blended AI can involve using different types of models, such as generative AI, decision trees, neural networks, and support vector machines. By combining their results, predictions are more accurate and reliable. This blending of models can be done through techniques like ensemble learning, where multiple models are trained independently and their predictions are combined to make a final decision.

Blended AI can also involve combining different AI techniques or technologies, such as natural language processing, computer vision, and expert systems, to tackle complex problems that require a multi-dimensional approach. For example, in a sales scenario AI could be used for lead generation and gathering information from social media such as LinkedIn posts, or understanding a prospect's hobbies and interests. Another blended AI could achieve customer profiling including past interactions and purchasing habits, by them, their industry and growth areas.

Blended AI could be used to do predictive analytics to look at historical sales data, market trends, and external factors to generate accurate sales forecasts. This method is critical to gauge and increase "efficiency, revenue, and productivity". Lastly, another could integrate all the information into the CRM to build and maintain better prospect and customer profiles. Blended AI aims to leverage the strengths of different AI techniques and technologies, allowing them to complement each other and create more powerful and comprehensive AI solutions. By combining multiple approaches, blended AI aims to achieve better performance, higher accuracy, improved robustness, and enhanced capabilities in solving diverse and challenging problems.
