= Howard O. McMahon =

Inventor and executive

Howard Oldford McMahon
- Born: 1914 September 16; Killam, Alberta
- Died: 1990 August 5 Mount Auburn Hospital, Cambridge, Massachusetts, US
- Education: B.A., M.A., Ph. D.
- Alma mater: Massachusetts Institute of Technology; University of British Columbia
- Employer: Arthur D. Little, Inc.
- Known for: Inventor, innovator and industrial executive in field of low-temperature physics

Howard Oldford McMahon (1914–1990) was an American electrical engineer who was Science Director, Vice President, Head of the Research and Development Division, and then President of Arthur D. Little, Inc, of Cambridge, Massachusetts, retiring from the Company in 1977. He was born in Alberta, Canada, and became a naturalized citizen of the United States. He made contributions to the field of cryogenics as inventor during the 1940s through the 1960s, and subsequently as an executive and member of the Board of Directors of both ADL and the Helix Technology Corporation, of Waltham, Massachusetts.

== Biography ==
McMahon's parents, Thomas Alexander McMahon and Tryphena Oldford McMahon, moved their family of five children from the prairie province of Alberta to the city of Victoria, in British Columbia, in the mid-1920s. McMahon attended Victoria College there for two years and then went on to earn his B.A. and M.A. degrees at the University of British Columbia, in Vancouver. During his undergraduate years, in the depth of the Great Depression, when his parents were unable to help pay his college tuition, he developed and patented a device later used in bubbling Christmas tree candle lights. The sale of the patent to a Canadian neon sign company for $100 enabled him to return to college, as he later told an interviewer.

For his doctoral work at M.I.T., McMahon worked in the laboratory of Samuel C. Collins, chemist and professor of mechanical engineering, who became McMahon's mentor. Prof. Collins brought in a very substantial grant from the National Defense Research Committee at the outset of World War II to work on a project to liquefy oxygen “for use on high-flying aircraft,” along with other defense-related work.

After receiving his Ph.D. in Physical Chemistry in 1941, McMahon continued at M.I.T. as a research associate, and joined Dr. Collins in working on the development of a small, portable oxygen machine for the Office of Scientific Research and Development, with funding from the Navy Department. Earl Stevenson, then president of Arthur D. Little, Inc., had recruited Collins and McMahon for this work. When McMahon was hired at ADL in 1943, he continued to collaborate with Dr. Collins on the application of very low temperatures to liquefying gases. Between 1945 and 1947 the Collins Helium Cryostat was engineered and became available for research laboratories. As reported in November 1947,

Dr. Collins is the inventor of the Collins Helium Cryostat, a comparatively simple device which can be operated by a laboratory technician, produces liquid helium and can maintain its space for experiments at any temperature down to 2 degrees Kelvin, or 456 degrees below zero on the Fahrenheit scale. Dr. McMahon assisted Dr. Collins in the original work on the Cryostat, and later, as a member of the staff of Arthur D. Little, Inc., was a leading participant in development of a design which could be regularly produced for operation by laboratory technicians. . . .:

Temperatures close to absolute zero can be reached only by liquefying helium, which previously has usually required a high-pressure cascade system of refrigeration, whereby liquefying helium gives up its heat to liquid hydrogen, which in turn is cooled by liquid air. Such an installation is both hazardous and extremely expensive. . . .There were only four helium-liquefying installations in North America before the first of the Cryostats went into use early in 1947.:

A 1948 Life Magazine spread on “Absolute Zero,” featuring the Collins Helium Cryostat, publicized both the technological feat of creating a safe and relatively inexpensive apparatus for approaching absolute zero, and the expected industrial and research uses of the machine.

Collins and McMahon both received medals from the Franklin Institute of Philadelphia in September 1951 for their collaborative work on the Collins Helium Cryostat.

In an interview many years later, McMahon said that “One of the first large-scale applications of cryogenic engineering was liquefying hydrogen for the original hydrogen bomb. Until that time, liquid hydrogen had been just a laboratory curiosity. We had to dream up the way to do it.” McMahon was also one of a number of Arthur D. Little scientists and engineers who were employed in supporting roles when the U.S. government was completing development of the first hydrogen bomb at the Los Alamos Laboratory of the Atomic Energy Commission in 1952. According to journalist E. J. Kahn Jr., whose history of the Arthur D. Little Company was based in part on interviews with current and former members of the company, ADL had a contract with the Atomic Energy Commission “to design, manufacture, field test, and operate” special aluminum-foil lined tank trucks that could safely carry hazardous materials. McMahon was one of the ADL staff that accompanied the trucks to Los Alamos for testing. He was also present at the first test explosion of the hydrogen bomb on Eniwetok Atoll, in the Marshall Islands in the Pacific, in October 1952.

In the late 1950s, with an ADL colleague, William E. Gifford, McMahon co-developed the Gifford-McMahon cryogenic refrigerator, based on “a unique method of reliably providing closed-cycle refrigeration at temperatures below 10 degrees Kelvin (-452 degrees Fahrenheit).”. These refrigerators had a variety of applications for further scientific research and technology, and the Gifford-McMahon refrigeration cycle on which they were based became an important standard for the semiconductor industry. Another application was “in support of the early U.S. space program,” when the Gifford-McMahon refrigerator “was used initially to cool microwave amplifiers in ground stations for satellite communications.”.

In the 1960s, as McMahon rose from the research laboratory through the ranks at ADL into managerial positions, the company at the same time increased the proportion of its consulting work that was devoted to a wide variety of management problems brought to it by clients that included corporations, municipalities and governments outside the U.S.; By 1966, in addition to employing 1,300 staff in the Cambridge headquarters, ADL had another 100 employees in branch offices in Zurich, London and Brussels. In his position as President of ADL, McMahon became increasingly visible in public discussions of the relationship of science and technology to social change.

For example, he served on a National Academy of Sciences committee studying environmental pollution during 1966, participated in a well-publicized seminar on air pollution in February that year, and was interviewed on the costs of pollution cleanup when the report came out in May;.

In 1969 he presided as the general chair at the 136th meeting of the American Association for the Advancement of Science, in Boston, at which lively and contentious public discussion took place regarding the roles of science, technology and industry creating as well as potentially alleviating social, economic and political problems in the U.S. and the world. According to one interview-based account, “It was largely on McMahon’s initiative that students and young scientists were invited for the first time to organize a formal critique of science. ‘We knew we were taking risks,’ he said, ‘but we thought it would be worth it.’ At the end of the week, after it was all over, he still thought it had been worth it. ‘The activists prodded the scientists into a greater sense of urgency over the issues of the day—the quality of life, the arms race, population control, hunger, our national scientific priorities. Coupled with the alarming content of many of the sessions, their persistent questioning had a powerful effect.’”

One of a series of presentations he made at M.I.T. during these years was as a panelist at a seminar held by the Department of Aeronautics and Astronautics, on the topic “The Engineering Profession and Social Change,” February 9, 1971.

In 1967, the manufacture of the ADL-Collins Helium Cryostat, originally carried out by a special Division within ADL, was turned over to an ADL subsidiary which soon became an independent company called Cryogenic Technology, Inc. McMahon became chair of the Board of Directors of the new company in 1972. When McMahon stepped down as ADL President in early 1972, he devoted much of his energy to helping guide the development of new cryogenic products by CTI and its parent company, Helix Technology Corporation.

In the mid-1970s, a cryogenic vacuum pump based on the Gifford-McMahon refrigeration cycle, making possible the processing of silicon wafers for the new microelectronics industry in clean, high-vacuum chambers, was developed at Helix. “Subsequently, the Gifford-McMahon cryogenic refrigeration cycle became the industry standard refrigeration cycle for cryopump applications in the rapidly growing semiconductor industry.”.

McMahon served as a Director of Helix from its inception, and chaired its Board from 1974 to 1979.

At the time of his death in 1990, McMahon held 22 patents and was recognized as an important pioneer in the development of the new field of cryogenics, through his scientific research and, equally importantly, his ability to envision and create practical technological applications for scientific innovations.

Ph.D. Thesis
"A Flow Calorimeter for the Determination of Joule-Thomson Coefficients and Specific Heats of Gases." Massachusetts Institute of Technology, June 1941. Samuel C. Collins, Thesis Advisor.

== Awards ==
- 1951 Edward Longstreth Medal, Franklin Institute
- 1952 Frank Forrest Award, American Ceramic Society
- 1979 Samuel C. Collins Award, Cryogenic Engineering Conference

== Publications ==
- Howard Oldford McMahon and Melville J. Marshall (1944). "The Molecular Complexity of Some Gases in High Frequency Dischanger." Journal of the Electrochemical Society, Vol. 84, Issue 1.
- Allen Latham Jr. and Howard O. McMahon (November 1947). "Research at Low Temperatures Simplified by a New Cryostat." The Nucleus, pp. 47, 51.
- H. O. McMahon (1950). Thermal Radiation from Partially Transparent Reflecting Bodies." Journal of the Optical Society of America, pp. 40, 376.
- Howard O. McMahon (March 1951). "Thermal Radiation Characteristics of Some Glasses." Journal of American Ceramic Society, Vol. 34, Issue 3, pp. 91–96.
- Howard O. McMahon (September–October 1957). "Superconductivity: Its Application to Electric Circuits." Electromechanical Design, pp. 98–102.
- Albert E. Slade and Howard O. McMahon (June 1957). "A Cryotron Catalog Memory System." Proceedings of Eastern Joint Computer Conference, pp. 115–120.

== Patents ==
2,429,474 Apparatus for Determining the Vapor Content of a Gas
2,494,304 Differential Boiler
2,537,276 Heat Exchanger (H.O.M. et al.)
2,553,550 Control for Oxygen Producing Apparatus - co-inventor Samuel C. Collins
2,607,572 Packed Column for Contacting Two Fluid Phases
2,620,573 Low-Pressure Product Drying
2,662,520 Preservation and Storage of Biological Materials
2,680,352 Apparatus and Method for Pumping Liquefied Gaseous Fluids
2,906,101 Fluid Expansion Refrigeration Method and Apparatus (H.O.M. & William E. Gifford)
2,938,356 Method and Means for Controlling Temperature Adjacent Living Bodies
2,958,836 Multiple-Characteristic Superconductive Wire
2,975,604 Method of Distribution of Condensable Gases
2,986,891 Low-Temperature Vessels
3,026,190 Elastomer Bonded Abrasives (H.O.M. & Paul C. Watson)
3,045,436 Pneumatic Expansion Method and Apparatus (William E. Gifford & H.O.M.)
3,062,968 Electric Current Control Circuit
3,106,648 Superconductive Data Processing Devices (H.O.M. & Albert E. Slade)
3,108,872 Photo-Thermolytical Vesicular Composition
3,149,299 Electronic Devices and Process for Forming Same (H.O.M. & John L. Miles)
3,234,747 Crystal Forming and Melting by Varying Applied Pressure (H.O.M. & George Feick III)
