= Profil =

Profil may refer to:

- La Mouette Profil, a French hang glider design
- Profil (band), a French musical group
- Profil (literary magazine), a Norwegian literary magazine
- profil (magazine), an Austrian news magazine
- Profil (Russian magazine), a Russian general interest magazine

== See also ==
- Profile (disambiguation)
