= Identification (information) =

Mapping of a known quantity to an unknown entity

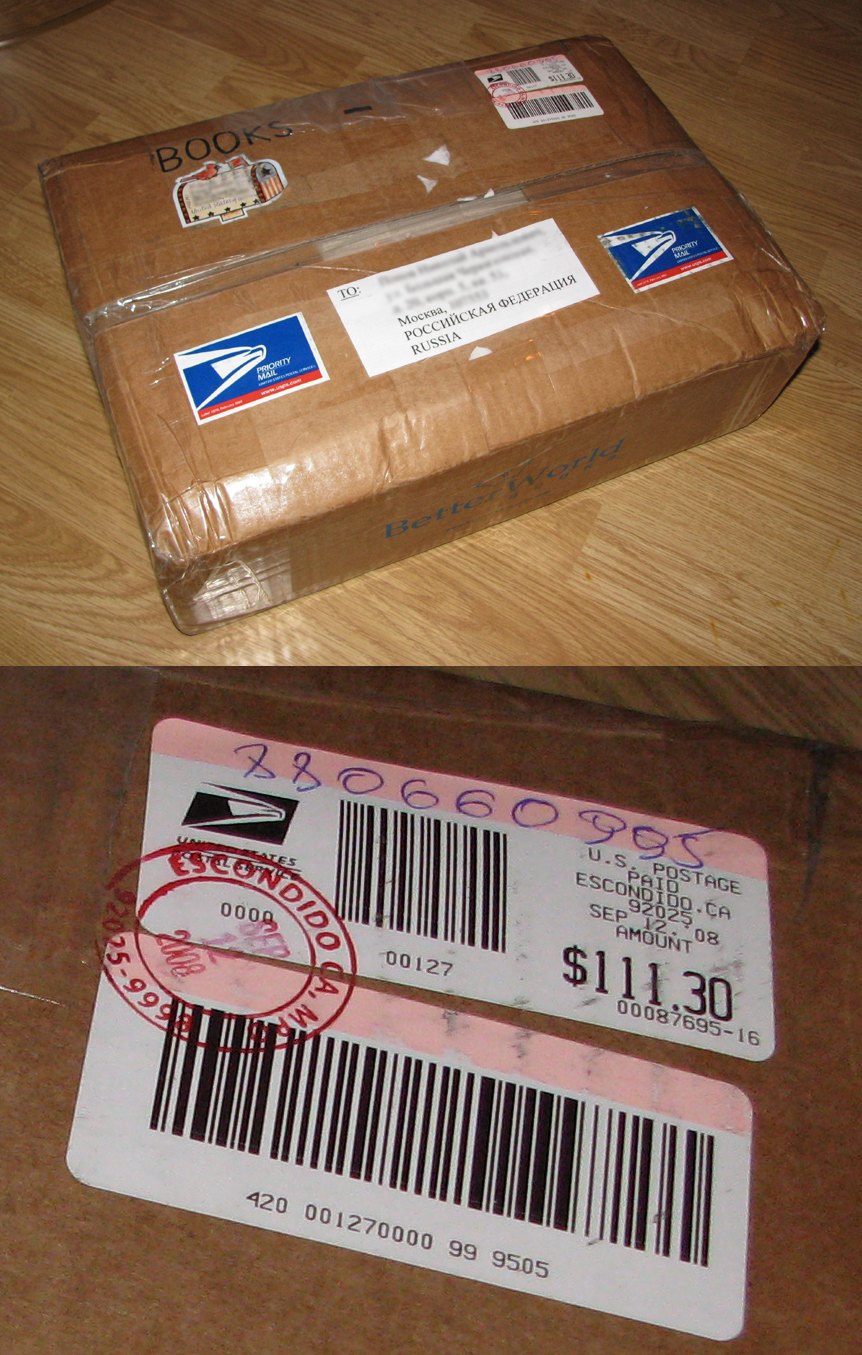
The code "420 001270000 99 9505" uniquely identifies this parcel.

For data storage, identification is the capability to find, retrieve, report, change, or delete specific data without ambiguity. This applies especially to information stored in databases. In database normalation, the process of organizing the fields and tables of a relational database to minimize redundancy and dependency, is the central, defining function of the discipline.

== See also ==
- Authentication
- Domain Name System
- Identification (disambiguation)
- Forensic profiling
- Profiling (information science)
- Unique identifier
