= Camille Utterback =

American installation artist

- Born: 1970 (age 55–56); Bloomington, Indiana, U.S.
- Education: Williams College, New York University
- Known for: Installation Art
- Website: camilleutterback.com

Camille Utterback (born 1970 in Bloomington, Indiana) is an interactive installation artist. Initially trained as a painter, her work is at the intersection of painting and interactive art. One of her most well-known installations is the work Text Rain (1999).

== Biography ==
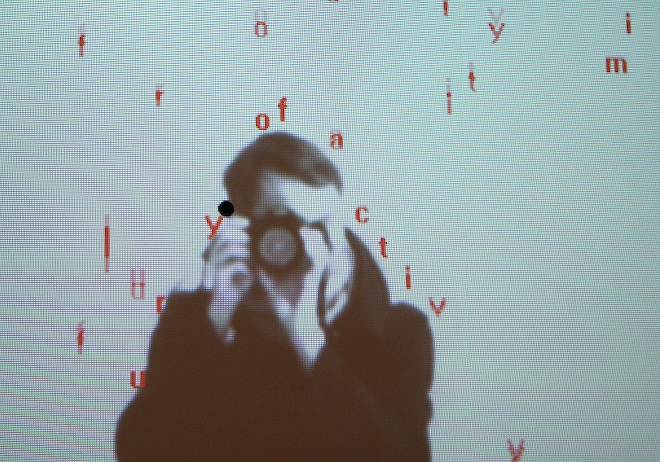
Camille Utterback's installation Text Rain

Utterback received her undergraduate degree from Williams College and her master's degree from the Interactive Telecommunications Program at New York University's Tisch School of the Arts. She is currently an Associate Professor in the Art and Art History Department at Stanford University and lives in San Francisco, California.

== Artwork ==
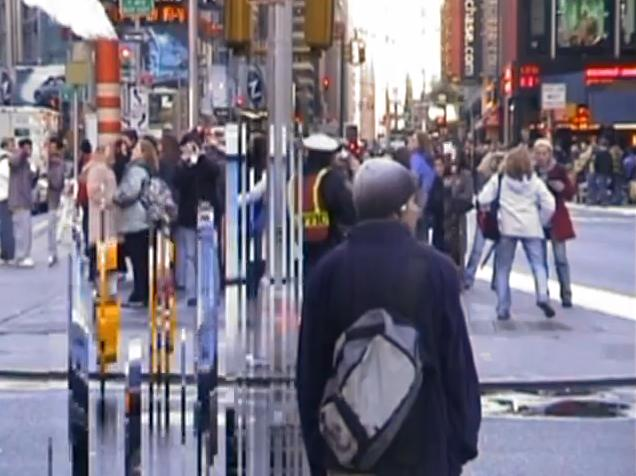
This is an image from the artist Camille Utterback

Examples of her work include Text Rain (1999), created in collaboration with Romy Achituv, in which participants use their bodies to lift and play with falling letters projected on a wall, and Shifting Times (2007), a public installation in San Jose, California that creates interactive projects based on the movements of pedestrians. Helen Lessick describes the latter as a "blending screens of twentieth and twenty-first century San José" in which the "images split and weave, shift between color and black and white, invoking loss and possibility, site and memory."

Utterback's other works include media sculptures and public artworks such as Aurora Organ.

Utterback says that she is interested in getting people to “think about the difference between something conceptual and something physical” and to “make a hypothesis, and then test it with their bodies.”

Her work has been exhibited at galleries, festivals, and museums internationally including New Museum of Contemporary Art (New York), the Museum of the Moving Image (New York), Smithsonian American Art Museum (Washington, D.C.) GAFFTA (San Francisco), the Frist Art Museum (Nashville, TN), the Ars Electronica Center (Linz, Austria) and the NTT InterCommunication Center (Tokyo, Japan).

Her generative animations, Fluid Studies (2013) creates video paintings on two screens.

Utterback created an installation called Precarious for the National Portrait Gallery exhibition Black Out: Silhouettes Then and Now, which opened in May, 2018.

=== Reviews ===
Text Rain was reviewed in #WomenTechLit as a landmark innovation.

== Awards ==
She has received several grants and awards including the Rockefeller Foundation New Media Fellowship, the MacArthur Foundation Fellowship, the Transmediale International Media Art Festival Award, an IBM Innovation Merit Award for her solo show Animated Gestures in the Boston Cyberarts Festival, and, in 2009, a "genius award" from the John D. and Catherine T. MacArthur Foundation. Utterback has taught media art at Parsons School of Design, and the Interactive Telecommunications Program at New York University.

== See also ==
- Interactive art
- Surveillance art
- !Women Art Revolution - Utterback, among others, was interviewed for this film

== Sources ==
- Christiane Paul (2003). Digital Art (World of Art series). London: Thames & Hudson. ISBN 0-500-20367-9.
- Jeffrey Shaw and Peter Weibel, eds. (2003). "Future Cinema: The Cinematic Imaginary After Film" MIT Press, Cambridge, MA. ISBN 0-262-69286-4.
