= Victim Notification System =

A Victim Notification System (VNS), Crime Victim Notification (CVN), or Statewide Automated Victim Notification Service (SAVNS), is a computer-controlled system by which victims of federal crimes are informed about the release of or the escape of the offender(s) who perpetrated that crime.

In the United States, the VNS is operated by the Federal Bureau of Investigation, the U.S. Attorney's Offices, and the Federal Bureau of Prisons. It is an electronic system accessible by telephone or via the internet, and information is also sent by mail. The VNS provides information on scheduled court events and their outcomes, as well as changes in the offenders custody status. Access to VNS information requires a Victim Identification Number (VIN) and a personal identification number (PIN).

In Canada, the VNS system consists of a computer operated telephone system, which automatically contacts the victims of crimes when the offender is either released from custody or escapes.

== See also ==
- All Points Bulletin
- Electronic tagging
