= Profiling =

Profiling, the extrapolation of information about something, based on known qualities, may refer specifically to:

== Technology ==
- Profiling (information science) in information science
- Profiling (computer programming) in software engineering
- DNA profiling

== Other ==
- Author profiling
- Data profiling
- Demographic profiling, used in marketing research
- Forensic profiling, used in several types of forensic science
- Offender profiling
- Racial profiling
- Sexual orientation profiling
- Geographic profiling

== See also ==
- Profile (disambiguation)
