= Surveillance & Society =

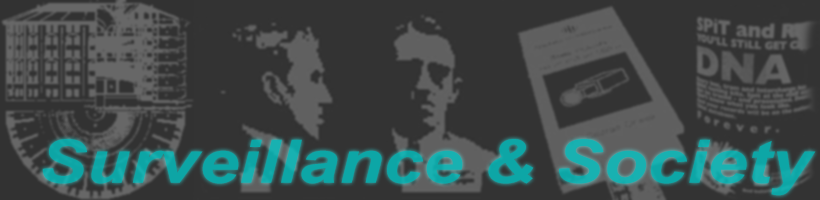
- Discipline: Science and technology studies, critical security studies
- Language: English
- Edited by: Torin Monahan, David Murakami Wood

Publication details
- History: 2002–present
- Publisher: Surveillance Studies Network
- Frequency: Quarterly
- Open access: Yes
- License: CC-BY-NC-ND

Standard abbreviations
- ISO 4: Surveill. Soc.

Indexing
- ISSN: 1477-7487
- OCLC no.: 769233772

Links
- Journal homepage; Online access; Online archive

Surveillance & Society is an open-access, peer-reviewed academic journal covering research on surveillance. The editors-in-chief are Torin Monahan (University of North Carolina at Chapel Hill) and David Murakami Wood (University of Ottawa).

The journal was established in 2002 by David Murakami Wood (Queen's University at Kingston), Kirstie S. Ball (University of St. Andrews), Clive Norris (University of Sheffield), David Lyon (Queen's University at Kingston), and Stephen Graham (Newcastle University). It is published by the Surveillance Studies Network.

== Abstracting and indexing ==
The journal is abstracted and indexed in:

- EBSCO databases
- Emerging Sources Citation Index
- International Bibliography of the Social Sciences
- ProQuest databases
- Scopus
