= Romy Achituv =

Israeli experimental multimedia artist

Romy Achituv (Hebrew: רומי אחיטוב; born 1958) is an Israeli experimental multimedia artist whose work engages issues of representation, language, time, and memory. Achituv is known for "Text Rain" which he co-created with Camille Utterback and "The Garden Library Database Visualization Project" which he created with Arteam, an interdisciplinary art collective.

Achituv was born in Rome, Italy. He lives and works in Israel, New York City, and Seoul, South Korea. His work is in the collection of the Smithsonian American Art Museum (Washington, D.C.).
