= Social sorting =

Social sorting is understood as the breakdown and categorization of group- or person-related raw data into various categories and segments by data manipulators and data brokers. Social sorting involves the key task of separating one group from the other. These groups can be based on income, education, race, ethnicity, gender, occupation, social status, derived power (social and political) and geographic residence. Depending on the goals of the manipulator raw data is collected and then further evolves into meaningful data in order to be exploited for a specific purpose. For example, the formulation of profiling and predictive policing are all derivations of social sorting.

== History ==
The concept is accredited to David Lyon, a sociologist who is best known for his work in surveillance studies.

== Themes ==
Criticisms are often directed at the laws, implemented rules, educational system, job employment opportunities and at the government. Questions are asked of the integrity of many socially constructed programs led by private and government institutions.

The September 11 attacks and the subsequent war on terror have fueled the desire for categorizing and profiling people. The beneficiaries that are associated with it are evident as it allows for a more transparent viewership. Some researchers such as David Lyon are concerned with the rise of big data as there are many implication on the daily lives of many.

According to David Lyon, Canadians are still unaware of the fact that surveillance which goes collaboratively with social sorting is now very much integrated into their daily lives. David Lyon discusses that the systematic routines and attention to personal detail which is encompassed into surveillance. The key criticism involves indifferent treatment to individuals based on their profile. Depending on the details of a person it can lead to the determination of whether the person may end up on a No Fly List.

David Lyon insinuates that social sorting through surveillance is a modern threat to freedom. Byproducts of social sorting are isolation, segregation and marginalization. Social sorting has highlighted issues that primarily involve equity and fairness.

Wilson & McBrier (2005) conducted a longitudinal study based on the theory of minority vulnerability of employees. These constitute to a group of African Americans who work for good financial income in the upper tier for relatively privileged jobs. "The minority vulnerability thesis, accordingly, maintains that African Americans are more likely to experience layoffs from upper-tier occupations than Whites even when the two groups have similar background socioeconomic statuses, have accumulated similar human-capital credentials, such as educational attainment and commitment to work, and have similar job/labor market characteristics, including union status as well as economic sector of employment. Findings indicate that, after controlling for seniority, African Americans are susceptible to layoffs on a relatively broad and generalized basis that is unstructured by traditional, stratification-based causal factors, namely, background socioeconomic status, human-capital credentials, and job/labor-market characteristics."

In 2015, The Data Broker Accountability and Transparency Act was resurrected by four U.S senators that would allow consumers to see and correct personal information held by data brokers and tell those businesses to stop sharing or selling it for marketing purposes.

== See also ==
- Affinity fraud
- Algorithmic radicalization
- Narrowcasting
- Targeted advertising

== References and further reading ==
- Biesele, M. 1993. Women Like Meat. The folklore and foraging ideology of the Kalahari Ju/'hoan. Witwatersrand: University Press.
- http://www.espncricinfo.com/southafrica/content/story/863161.html
- https://journals1.scholarsportal.info/pdf/08848971/v20i0002/301_ralopaojlfuo.xml%5B%5D
- http://cognet.mit.edu/book/sorting-things-out
- https://www.youtube.com/watch?v=xtAa-f-1rTg
- http://www.universityaffairs.ca/news/news-article/researchers-concerned-by-the-rise-of-big-data-surveillance/
- http://www.computerworld.com/article/2893693/lawmakers-target-data-brokers-in-privacy-bill.html
