= Surveillance Studies Network =

Academic association focused on surveillance

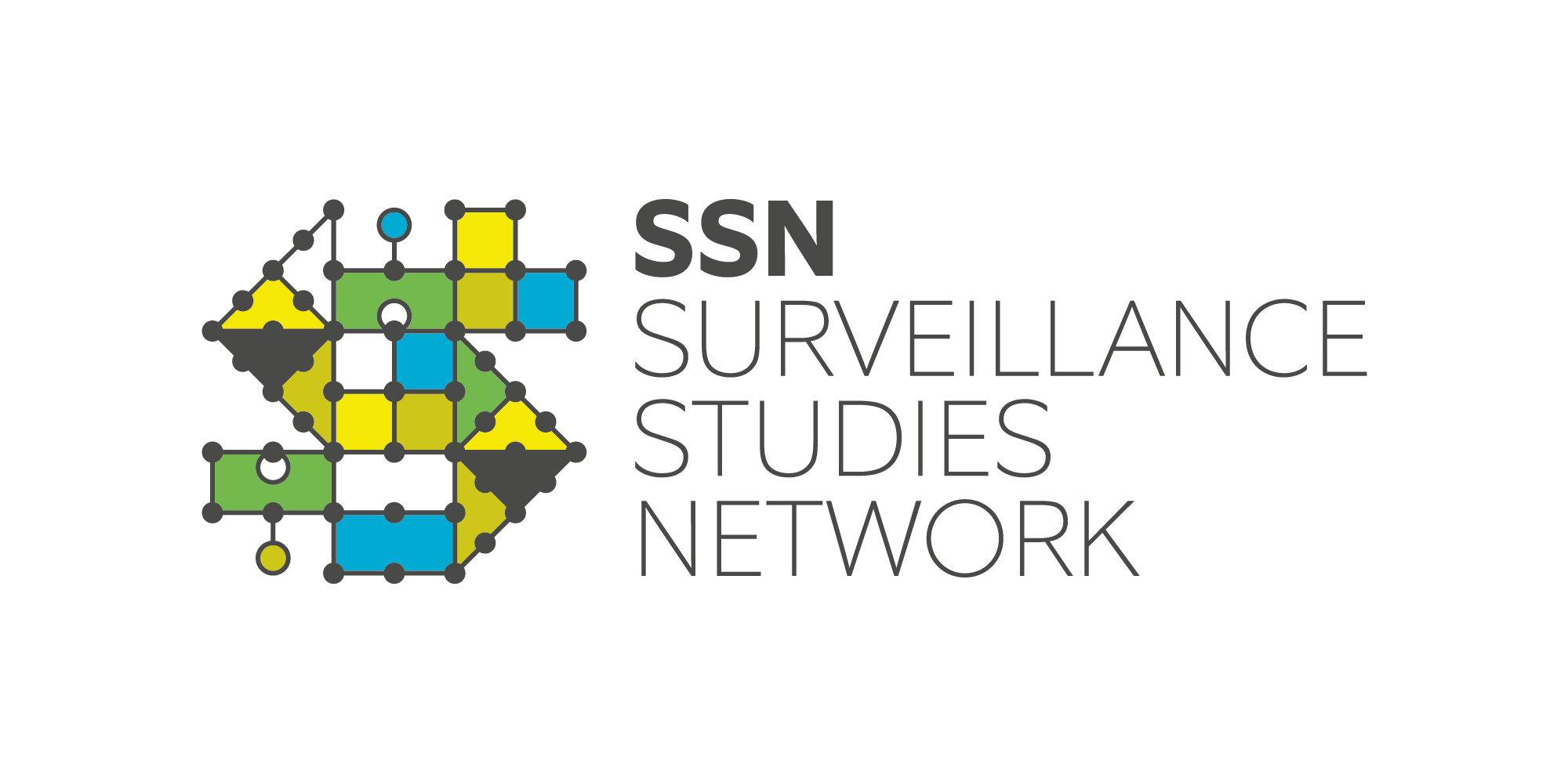
- Abbreviation: SSN
- Formation: 2006
- Type: Non-profit organization
- Registration no.: 1117449
- Purpose: Learned society
- Headquarters: London, United Kingdom
- Fields: Science and Technology Studies, Communication Studies, Sociology, Criminology, Geography, and many other fields
- Directors: Azadeh Akbari, David Murakami Wood, Bryce Newell, and Gavin Smith
- Publication: Surveillance & Society
- Website: www.surveillance-studies.net

The Surveillance Studies Network (SSN) is a non-profit academic association dedicated to the study of surveillance in all its forms. It was founded in 2006 as a charitable company registered in the UK. Its purpose is to support an international, transdisciplinary academic community researching and teaching about surveillance in society. The SSN publishes the journal Surveillance & Society, holds biennial conferences, makes awards, and provides small research grants.

== Officers and governance ==
Current Directors include Azadeh Akbari, David Murakami Wood, Bryce Newell, and Gavin Smith. Previous Directors include Rosamunde van Brakel, Kirstie Ball, Fernanda Bruno, Julia Chan, Pete Fussey, Stephen Graham, David Lyon, Torin Monahan, Clive Norris, Joshua Reeves, Emmeline Taylor, Dean Wilson, Nils Zurawski.

== Membership ==
Membership is open to any individual interested in the study of surveillance in society.

== Publications ==
The SSN regularly publishes

- Surveillance & Society: A fully open-access academic journal published quarterly (in March, June, September, and December). It offers peer-reviewed research articles, dialogue sections on contemporary issues, interviews, and artistic presentations.
- Blink: a blog providing summaries of key articles from Surveillance & Society, interviews, research notes, and publication tips.

== Prizes and grants ==
The SSN awards a number of prizes and grants including

- Outstanding Achievement Award
- Book Prize
- Arts Prize
- Early Career Researcher Award
- Small Research Grants

== Reports ==
In 2006, the Information Commissioner's Office in the United Kingdom contracted with the Surveillance Studies Network to produce "A Report on the Surveillance Society," which was presented at the 28th International Data Protection and Privacy Commissioners' Conference in London. The report received international media attention and led to several parliamentary investigations into surveillance in the UK. In 2010, SSN updated the report, which was presented to Parliament by the UK Information Commissioner, Christopher Graham.
