= Profile (1955 TV series) =

- Genre: biography
- Presented by: Percy Saltzman (1955)
- Country of origin: Canada
- Original language: English
- No. of seasons: 3

Production
- Producers: Cliff Solway; Vincent Tovell
- Running time: 30 minutes

Original release
- Network: CBC Television
- Release: 16 June 1955 – 29 October 1957

Profile is a Canadian biographical documentary television series that aired on CBC Television from 1955 to 1957.

== Premise ==
The series featured biographical documentaries on such Canadian and international personalities as Thérèse Casgrain, Moses Coady, Robert Frost, Billy Graham, A. Y. Jackson, Paul-Émile Léger, Arthur Lismer, Seán O'Casey, Bertrand Russell, Vilhjalmur Stefansson, Edward Steichen, Paul Tillich and Arnold Toynbee. The intent was for the interviews to be conducted at the subjects homes, although existing film biographies were used on occasion.

== Scheduling ==
This half-hour series was broadcast for three seasons as follows (times in Eastern):

Day	Time	Season run
Thursdays	10:30 p.m.	16 June to 22 September 1955
Sundays	10:00 p.m.	27 May to 23 September 1956
Thursdays	10:00 p.m.	9 July to 29 October 1957
