= Low profile =

Low profile may refer to:

== Music ==
- Low Profile, an American hip hop duo
- Low Profile (New Zealand band)

== Space-saving technology ==
=== Computing ===
- Various computer and component form factors
  - Low profile PCI cards
  - Low-profile Quad Flat Package, a variation of the QFP integrated circuit package design

=== Other technologies ===
- Low profile ducting, in heating, ventilation, and air conditioning

== Other uses ==
- The avoidance of drawing attention, often as a technique of espionage or to maintain privacy
- Low Profile Group, a clothing manufacturer supplying UK retail stores
