= The Information Society =

- Discipline: Sociology
- Language: English

Publication details
- History: 1981–present
- Publisher: Taylor and Francis (United States)
- Impact factor: 3.5 (2022)

Standard abbreviations
- ISO 4: Inf. Soc.

Indexing
- CODEN: INSCD8
- ISSN: 0197-2243 (print); 1087-6537 (web)
- LCCN: 81645518
- OCLC no.: 5986609

Links
- Journal homepage; Online access

The Information Society is a peer-reviewed academic journal on sociology, that was established in 1981. It is published five times per year by Routledge and covers topics related to information technologies and changes in society and culture. According to the Journal Citation Reports, the journal has a 2014 impact factor of 1.048, ranking it 31st out of 85 journals in the category "Information Science & Library Science".

The concept of information society refers to a form of society characterized by the importance of the production and management of information and knowledge. Webster, F (2014). Theories of the Information Society. New York, NY: Routledge
