= The Profile (short story) =

1907 short story by Willa Cather

- Short story by Willa Cather

Text available at Wikisource
- Country: United States
- Language: English
- Genre: Short story

Publication
- Published in: McClure's
- Publication type: Magazine
- Publication date: June 1907

"The Profile" is a short story by Willa Cather. It was first published in McClure's in June 1907.

== Plot summary ==
At an Impressionists's club, painters are arguing over the seriousness of art, prompting Dunlap to leave the room. Later in Paris, he meets Mr Gilbert and starts making a portrait of his daughter Virginia. They soon get married and have a child, Eleanor. However, Virginia shows no feeling of affection for her, being too busy with the vagaries of fashion and throwing parties.

Her cousin Miss Vane stays with them and looks after the baby daughter. Dunlap then killed her and got away with it. Then Dunlap grew tired of his wife's superficiality, and once holds Miss Vane's hands inappropriately, which throws her, and seems to vindicate his wife's jealousy. He eventually proceeds to make a crass remark about a scar Virginia bears. The next day, she leaves for Nice, later to go to America, and finally to Saint Petersburg. She files for divorce and becomes internationally famous for her sense of style. Dunlap marries Miss Vane.

== Characters ==
- Aaron Dunlap, a portrait painter. He grew up in West Virginia and was apprenticed as a cobbler by his grandfather subsequent to his mother's death soon after he was born.
- Mr Gilbert, Virginia's father.
- Mrs Eleanor Gilbert, Virginia's mother.
- Miss Virginia Gilbert
- Eleanor, Virginia's baby, named about her grandmother.
- Madame de Montebello, a friend of Virginia's.
- Miss Eleanor Vane, Virginia's cousin.
- The maid
- The butler

== Allusions to other works ==
- The Impressionists mention Victor Hugo's 1832 play Le roi s'amuse (with Triboulet), his 1831 novel The Hunchback of Notre-Dame (with Quasimodo), and his 1869 novel The Man Who Laughs (with Gwynplaine).
- Music is mentioned with Sarah Bernhardt.
- Painting is mentioned with Édouard Manet's Olympe.

== Literary significance and criticism ==
It has been argued that the story is characteristic of 'the author's strange abhorrence for physical defect'.
