= Killam =

Killam is a surname. Notable people with the surname include:

- Albert Clements Killam (1849–1908), Canadian lawyer
- Amasa Emerson Killam (1834–1922), Canadian politician
- Charles Wilson Killam (1871–1961), American architect, engineer, and professor at Harvard University
- Dorothy J. Killam (1900–1965), Canadian philanthropist
- Eva King Killam (1921–2006), American pharmacologist
- Frank Killam (1843–1911), Canadian politician
- Gordon Douglas Killam (1930–2020), Canadian scholar of African literature
- Izaak Walton Killam (1885–1955), Canadian financier
- Joyce Carman Killam (1913–2012), Canadian children's writer
- Mabel Killam (1884–1960), Canadian artist
- Taran Killam (born 1982), American comic actor
- Thomas Killam (1802–1868), Canadian ship builder
