= Torin Monahan =

American academic

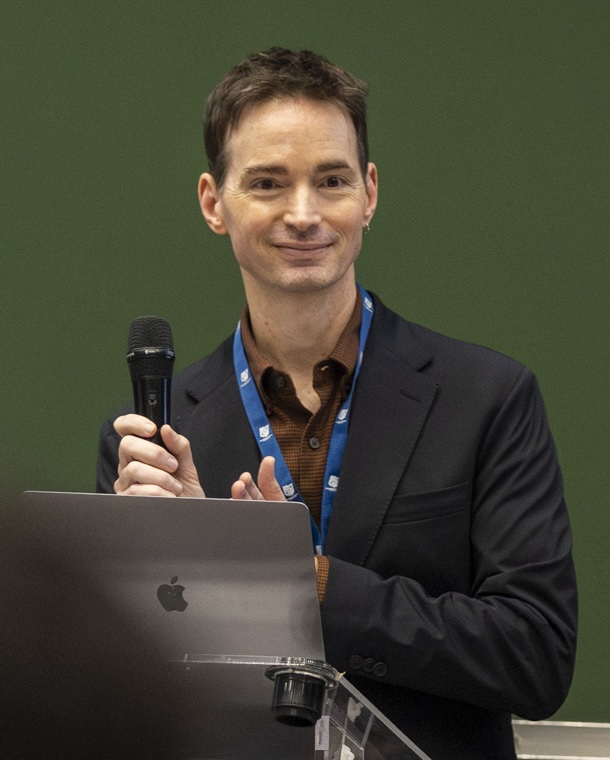
- Monahan presenting at the award ceremony of the Surveillance Studies Network conference in Lille, France, 2026.

Academic background
- Education: California State University, Northridge, Rensselaer Polytechnic Institute
- Thesis: Designing Flexible Futures: Globalization, Technological Change, and Institutional Conflict in the Los Angeles Public School System. (2003)
- Doctoral advisor: David J. Hess

Academic work
- Institutions: University of North Carolina at Chapel Hill, Vanderbilt University, Arizona State University
- Notable works: Surveillance in the Time of Insecurity (2010), Surveillance Studies: A Reader (2018)
- Website: https://www.torinmonahan.com/

Torin Monahan is co-Editor-in-Chief of the journal Surveillance & Society, a former director of the Surveillance Studies Network, and a professor of communication at the University of North Carolina at Chapel Hill. He is best known for his work on the social and cultural dimensions of surveillance systems.

== Education ==
Monahan received a Bachelor of Arts in English from California State University, Northridge in 1993, and a Master of Arts in English (with distinction) from the same university in 1996. Monahan then pursued additional graduate training in Science and Technology Studies (STS) at Rensselaer Polytechnic Institute in upstate New York, receiving a Master of Science in STS in 2002 followed by a PhD in STS in 2003.

== Career ==
Monahan worked as an assistant professor in the School of Justice and Social Inquiry at Arizona State University from 2003 to 2008. He moved to Vanderbilt University in 2008, where he was an associate professor of Human and Organizational Development and associate professor of medicine from 2008 to 2012. He began as an associate professor in the Department of Communication at the University of North Carolina at Chapel Hill in 2013 and has been Professor at the same institution since 2015. Additionally, from 2015 to 2020 Monahan served as a director of the international Surveillance Studies Network, which is the primary professional academic association dedicated to the critical study of surveillance.

== Research ==
Monahan's research focuses on institutional and cultural transformations with new technologies, with a particular emphasis on surveillance and security programs. He has written on Department of Homeland Security data fusion centers, surveillance and inequality in schools, managerial supervision with hospital tracking systems, racial violence, and artistic modes of resistance to state surveillance. He has served as Principal Investigator on several National Science Foundation-funded grants, including the Platform Mediation research project studying the ways that cities contend with platforms like Uber and Airbnb.

== Reception ==
Monahan's book Surveillance in the Time of Insecurity received the 2011 Surveillance Studies Book Prize from the Surveillance Studies Network for the world's best English language book published on the topic of surveillance. His book Crisis Vision received honorable mention for the 2023 Surveillance Studies Book Prize.

== Selected works ==
- Monahan, Torin. Globalization, Technological Change, and Public Education. Routledge (2005).
- Monahan, Torin. (Ed.) Surveillance and Security: Technological Politics and Power in Everyday Life. Routledge (2006).
- Monahan, Torin, and Rodolfo D. Torres (Eds.) Schools under Surveillance: Cultures of Control in Public Education. New Brunswick: Rutgers University Press (2010).
- Monahan, Torin. Surveillance in the Time of Insecurity. Rutgers University Press (2010).
- Gilliom, John, and Torin Monahan. SuperVision: An Introduction to the Surveillance Society. University of Chicago Press (2013).
- Monahan, Torin, and David Murakami Wood. (Eds.) Surveillance Studies: A Reader. Oxford University Press (2018).
- Monahan, Torin. Crisis Vision: Race and the Cultural Production of Surveillance. Duke University Press (2022).
