= Forensic profiling =

Study of trace evidence in criminal investigations

Forensic profiling is the study of trace evidence by using scientific and analytical methods in order to create and find information that could help law enforcement in any kind of investigations. This informations can help with the process of identifying suspects and potentially convict them in judicial proceedings.

The term "forensic" in this context refers to information that can be used as evidence in a court room (Geradts & Sommer 2006, p. 10). The traces that are analyzed originate from criminal or legal activities. The traces that are analyzed are not just helpful in the courtroom, but they also can help in other areas such as investigation, intelligence, surveillance and risk analysis.

Many may think that forensic profiling is the same thing as offender profiling, but it is different in a way where forensic profiling is the identification of correlations in data sets that can then distinguish individuals. Offender profiling is the psychological characteristics of the potential suspects that can primarily focus on.

== Profiling techniques ==
Forensic profiling is generally conducted using data mining technology, as a means by which relevant patterns are discovered, and profiles are generated from large quantities of data.

A distinction of forms of profiles that are used in a given context is necessary before evaluating applications of data mining techniques for forensic profiling.

== Data available ==
The data available to law enforcement agencies is divided into two categories (Geradts & Sommer 2008, p. 15):

- Nominal data directly designates persons or objects (recidivists, intelligence files and suspect files, stolen vehicles or objects, etc.) and their relations. Nominal data may also be obtained in the framework of specific investigations. This could include for instance, a list of calls made with a mobile phone (card and/or phone) that cover a certain time period, a list of people corresponding to a certain profile, or data obtained through surveillances.
- Crime data consists of traces that result from criminal activities: physical traces, other information collected at the scene, from witnesses or victims or some electronic traces, as well as reconstructed descriptions of cases (modus operandi, time intervals, duration and place) and their relations (links between cases, series).

== Types ==
- DNA profiling is used for the identification of individuals based on their respective DNA profiles.
- Digital Image Forensics. This covers: image source identification (which is based on specific characteristics of the image acquisition device or technology) and malicious post-processing or tampering (whose aim is for instance to verify the integrity of particular features) (Popescu & Farid 2005).
- Illicit drug profiling, which refers to the systematic extraction and storage of chemical attributes of drugs seized in order to obtain indications on the manufacture and distribution processes, the size and the evolution of the market. (Terrettaz-Zufferey et al. 2007)
- Forensic Information Technology (forensic IT), refers to the analysis of the digital traces that people leave when using information technology.
- Offender profiling i.e. psychological profiling of the criminal.

== Issues ==
The use of profiling techniques represents threats to the privacy of the individual and the protection of fundamental freedoms. Criminal data is data that is collected and processed for suppressing criminal offenses which often consists of personal data. One of the issues is the re-use of personal data collected within one criminal investigation for a purpose other than the one for which it was collected. An example from the book, "The Psychology and Sociology of Wrongful Convictions: Forensic Science Reform," there was a profiling error, in which this woman was raped and slaughtered by a serial killer. The suspect was named the Boston Strangler and investigators worked hard in trying to gather a profile for this criminal. Experts eventually came up with the Boston Strangler being two people and that both men lived alone, most likely schoolteachers, and one of them was homosexual. The criminal finally confessed to the crime and his DNA matched up with the scene, but his profile didn't fit the crime. The profile the experts came up with didn't match any characteristics of the killer (pp.6). Creating profiles just creates tunnel vision because investigators will be focusing on finding a specific individual that the profile fits, when in reality, the profiling system is sometimes believed to be insanely flawed and is considered useless to the investigators.

There are several methods in which include technical, legal, and behavioral accessibilities that are available in order to address some of the issues associated with forensic profiling. For instance, in Europe the European Convention on Human Rights provides a number of instruments for the Protection of Individuals concerning Automatic Processing of Personal Data.

== Scientific Validity and Criticism ==
The subject of ongoing debate that is related to forensic profiling, has been the scientific validity that it provides. Some methods that are used, are supported by empirical research, while other methods used, do not provide enough consistent validation. There is a demand for stronger scientific standards and more research throughout all topics of forensic sciences.

A discovery that researchers have made is the role of cognitive bias that is involved with any forensic decision making process. Researchers have noted that context dependent information can influence the way that certain evidence is interpreted within investigations by law enforcement. These discoveries show how important it is that using any type of profiling technique should be used with caution within criminal investigations.

== Ethical and Privacy Concerns ==
Techniques for forensic profiling relies a lot on large amounts of data, which could include digital, personal, or forensic information. There are concerns on the privacy of individuals with the collection and the use of the data that is being pulled. Researchers have found that background information and bias can make or break how forensic evidence is seen and interpreted during investigations.

The use of profiling technologies have the potential of increasing surveillance and raising ethical concerns about how the data is collected and then used within investigations. It is important to have awareness on the protection of individual rights as well as the importance of balancing investigative benefits at the same time.

== See also ==
- Forensic identification
- Profiling (disambiguation)
- Use of social network websites in investigations
