= AFGROW =

AFGROW (Air Force Grow) is a Damage Tolerance Analysis (DTA) computer program that calculates crack initiation, fatigue crack growth, and fracture to predict the life of metallic structures. Originally developed by the Air Force Research Laboratory, AFGROW is mainly used for aerospace applications, but can be applied to any type of metallic structure that experiences fatigue cracking.

== History ==
AFGROW's history traces back to a crack growth life prediction program (ASDGRO) which was written in BASIC for IBM-PCs by E. Davidson at ASD/ENSF in the early-mid-1980s. In 1985, ASDGRO was used as the basis for crack growth analysis for the Sikorsky H-53 helicopter under contract to Warner-Robins ALC. The program was modified to utilize very large load spectra, approximate stress intensity solutions for cracks in arbitrary stress fields, and use a tabular crack growth rate relationship based on the Walker equation on a point-by-point basis (Harter T-Method). The point loaded crack solution from the Tada, Paris, and Irwin Stress Intensity Factor Handbook was originally used to determine K (for arbitrary stress fields) by integration over the crack length using the unflawed stress distribution independently for each crack dimension. A new method was developed by F. Grimsley (AFWAL/FIBEC) to determine stress intensity, which used a 2-D Gaussian integration scheme with Richardson Extrapolation which was optimized by G. Sendeckyj (AFWAL/FIBEC). The resulting program was named MODGRO since it was a modified version of ASDGRO.

Many modifications were made during the late 1980s and early 1990s. The primary modification was changing the coding language from BASIC to Turbo Pascal and C. Numerous small changes/repairs were made based on errors that were discovered. During this time period, NASA/Dryden implemented MODGRO in the analysis for the flight test program for the X-29.

In 1993, the Navy was interested in using MODGRO to assist in a program to assess the effect of certain (classified) environments on the damage tolerance of aircraft. Work began at that time to convert the MODGRO, Version 3.X to the C language for UNIX to provide performance and portability to several UNIX Workstations. In 1994, MODGRO was renamed AFGROW, Version 3.X.

Since 1996, the Windows-based version of AFGROW has replaced the UNIX version since the demand for the UNIX version did not justify the cost to maintain it. There was also an experiment to port AFGROW to the Mac OS but there was a lack of demand. An automated capability was added in the form of a Microsoft Component Object Model (COM) interface.

The program is now developed and maintained by LexTech, Inc.

== Software architecture ==
The stress intensity factor library provides models for over 30 different crack geometries (including tension, bending and bearing loading for many cases). In addition, a multiple crack capability allows the analysis of two independent cracks in a plate (including hole effects) and a non-symmetric cracked corner. Finite Element (FE) based solutions are available for two, non-symmetric through cracks at holes as well as cracks growing toward holes. This capability allows the analysis of more than one crack growing from a row of fastener holes.

AFGROW implements five different crack growth models (Forman Equation, Walker Equation, Tabular lookup, Harter-T Method and NASGRO Equation ) to determine crack growth per applied cyclic loading. Other user options include five load interaction (retardation) models (closure, Fastran, Hsu, Wheeler, and Generalized Willenborg), a strain-life based fatigue crack initiation model, and the ability to perform a crack growth analysis with the effect of the bonded repair. The program also includes tools such as: stress intensity solutions, beta modification factors (ability to estimate stress intensity factors for cases, which may not be an exact match for one of the stress intensity solutions provided), a residual stress analysis capability, cycle counting, and the ability to automatically transfer output data to Microsoft Excel.

AFGROW uses COM (Component Object Model) Automation interfaces that allow the use of scripts in other Windows applications. The program has a plug-in crack geometry interface that interfaces with structural analysis programs capable of calculating stress intensity factors (K) in the Windows environment. Users may create their own stress intensity solutions by writing and compiling dynamic link libraries (DLLs) using relatively simple codes. This includes the ability to animate the crack growth. This interface also makes it possible for finite element analysis software to provide three-dimensional based stress intensity information throughout the crack life prediction process.

It is possible to select cases with two, independent cracks (with and without holes). A plug-in stress intensity model capability allows the creation of stress intensity solutions in the form of a Windows DLL (dynamic link library). Drawing tools allow solutions to be animated during the analysis. Interactive stress intensity solutions allow the use of an external FEM code to return updated stress intensity solutions.
