= Fastran =

Crack growth calculation program

Fastran is a computer program for calculating the rate of fatigue crack growth by combining crack growth equations and a simulation of the plasticity at the crack tip.

Fastran models accelerations and retardation and other variable amplitude loading effects in crack growth using a crack closure model. The program uses a strip yield model of the crack tip that was first proposed by D. S. Dugdale to calculate the size of the plastic zone ahead of a crack tip. A series of elastic-perfectly plastic strips (originally 30 strips were used) that model the region both ahead and behind the crack tip is used to keep track of the plasticity produced at the crack tip. As the crack grows, the strips are cut and leave a region of raised plastic material in the crack wake that prevents the complete closure of a crack. This profile of the crack is used to calculate the stress intensity factor level $K_\text{op}$ at which the crack tip is fully open. The effective stress intensity factor range is then

$$\Delta K_\text{eff} = K_\text{max} - \text{max}(K_\text{op}, K_\text{min})$$

which allows the rate of growth for the loading cycle to be obtained from the crack growth equation. The rate of crack growth is then calculated from

$${da \over dN} = f(\Delta K_\text{eff})$$

== History ==
Fastran was written in the 1980s by James C. Newman while at NASA and is an acronym derived from NASA FATIGUE CRACK GROWTH STRUCTURAL ANALYSIS. Crack closure was first observed by Wolf Elber as propping open a crack tip resulting in a reduction of the full stress intensity range or crack tip driving force. It was assumed this was due to plasticity at the crack tip preventing the fracture surfaces from fully closing.

A similar program CORPUS was also developed around the same time by A. U. de Koning.

FASTRAN is written in the Fortran programming language.

== Features ==
=== Geometry factors ===
The geometry factor $\beta$ relates the far-field stresses to the region near the crack tip. Many standard geometry factors are supplied in the program. These scaling factors allow the calculation of the stress intensity factor from the applied loading sequence using

$$K = \beta \sigma \sqrt{\pi a}$$

where $\sigma$ is the applied far field stress and $a$ is the crack length.

The loading sequence is given as a file of sequential turning points that represent the loading sequence. This in combination with a load factor is used to supply the far-field stress of the given geometry. The load sequence is converted into a series of individual load cycles by a method known as rainflow on the fly which is a modified form of the standard rainflow-counting algorithm.

The closure model has also been used to explain the increase rate of growth seen with small cracks known as the small crack effect.

=== Crack growth equations ===
Fastran has a variety of crack growth equations built in along with piece wise linear equations that can be read from file.

== Theory ==
This model allows the calculation of the stress ratio $R$ or mean stress effect that gives rise to the increased rate of crack growth at higher stress ratios. Experiments have shown the crack is typically open at $R>0.7$. In addition the model is able to predict retardation due to overloads which increase the plastic material in the wake of the crack. It also explains the acceleration due to underloads where the crack growth rate increases following an underload which compresses the crack faces together and reduced the degree of interference lowering $K_\text{op}$.

The onset of plasticity is given by the flow stress whose value typically lies mid-way between the yield and ultimate stresses. The flow stress scaling parameter $\alpha$ is used to adjust the flow stress to the degree of restraint experienced at the crack tip. This value reflects the stress state at the crack tip and typically lies between a value of $\pi$ for plane stress and $2\pi$ for plane strain. The parameter is also used as an adjustment variable to correct the rate of crack to match test data.

== Limitations ==
Plasticity will be greater in regions of plane stress but Fastran only models the crack as a 2d cross section.

== Usage ==
Fastran has been used in the research community and for maintaining the safe life of aircraft as the C-130 used by the USAF, RAF and RAAF. If forms a component of the crack growth program Nasgro.
