= Paris' law =

Formula in materials science

Typical plot of crack growth rate with respect to the stress intensity range where the Paris–Erdogan equation fits the central, linear region of Regime B.

Paris' law (also known as the Paris–Erdogan equation) is a crack growth equation that gives the rate of growth of a fatigue crack. The stress intensity factor $K$ characterises the load around a crack tip and the rate of crack growth is experimentally shown to be a function of the range of stress intensity $\Delta K$ seen in a loading cycle. The Paris equation is

$$\begin{align}
{da \over dN} &= C\left(\Delta K\right)^{m},
\end{align}$$

where $a$ is the crack length and ${\rm d}a/{\rm d}N$ is the fatigue crack growth for a load cycle $N$. The material coefficients $C$ and $m$ are obtained experimentally and also depend on environment, frequency, temperature and stress ratio. The stress intensity factor range has been found to correlate the rate of crack growth from a variety of different conditions and is the difference between the maximum and minimum stress intensity factors in a load cycle and is defined as

$$\Delta K= K_{\text{max}}-K_{\text{min}}.$$

Being a power law relationship between the crack growth rate during cyclic loading and the range of the stress intensity factor, the Paris–Erdogan equation can be visualized as a straight line on a log-log plot, where the x-axis is denoted by the range of the stress intensity factor and the y-axis is denoted by the crack growth rate.

The ability of ΔK to correlate crack growth rate data depends to a large extent on the fact that alternating stresses causing crack growth are small compared to the yield strength. Therefore crack tip plastic zones are small compared to crack length even in very ductile materials like stainless steels.

The equation gives the growth for a single cycle. Single cycles can be readily counted for constant-amplitude loading. Additional cycle identification techniques such as rainflow-counting algorithm need to be used to extract the equivalent constant-amplitude cycles from a variable-amplitude loading sequence.

== History ==
In a 1961 paper, P. C. Paris presented experiments indicating that the rate of fatigue crack growth depends on the linear elastic stress intensity factor. Then in their 1963 paper, Paris and Erdogan suggested the Paris Law equation with the aside remark "The authors are hesitant but cannot resist the temptation to draw the straight line slope 1/4 through the data" after reviewing data on a log-log plot of crack growth versus stress intensity range. The Paris equation was then presented with the fixed exponent of 4.

== Domain of applicability ==
=== Stress ratio ===
Higher mean stress is known to increase the rate of crack growth and is known as the mean stress effect. The mean stress of a cycle is expressed in terms of the stress ratio $R$ which is defined as

$$R = {K_{\text{min}} \over K_{\text{max}}},$$

or ratio of minimum to maximum stress intensity factors. In the linear elastic fracture regime, $R$ is also equivalent to the load ratio

$$R \equiv {P_{\text{min}} \over P_{\text{max}}}.$$

The Paris–Erdogan equation does not explicitly include the effect of stress ratio, although equation coefficients can be chosen for a specific stress ratio. Other crack growth equations such as the Forman equation do explicitly include the effect of stress ratio, as does the Elber equation by modelling the effect of crack closure.

=== Intermediate stress intensity range ===
The Paris–Erdogan equation holds over the mid-range of growth rate regime, but does not apply for very low values of $\Delta K$approaching the threshold value $\Delta K_{\text{th}}$, or for very high values approaching the material's fracture toughness, $K_{\text{Ic}}$. The alternating stress intensity at the critical limit is given by
$$\begin{align}
\Delta K_{\text{cr}} &= (1-R)K_{\text{Ic}}
\end{align}$$.

The slope of the crack growth rate curve on log-log scale denotes the value of the exponent $m$ and is typically found to lie between $2$ and $4$, although for materials with low static fracture toughness such as high-strength steels, the value of $m$ can be as high as $10$.

=== Long cracks ===
Because the size of the plastic zone $(r_{\text{p}} \approx K_{I}^2/\sigma_{y}^2)$ is small in comparison to the crack length, $a$ (here, $\sigma_{y}$ is yield stress), the approximation of small-scale yielding applies, enabling the use of linear elastic fracture mechanics and the stress intensity factor. Thus, the Paris–Erdogan equation is only valid in the linear elastic fracture regime, under tensile loading and for long cracks.
