= Crack closure =

Crack closure is a phenomenon in fatigue loading, where the opposing faces of a crack remain in contact even with an external load acting on the material. As the load is increased, a critical value will be reached at which time the crack becomes open. Crack closure occurs from the presence of material propping open the crack faces and can arise from many sources including plastic deformation or phase transformation during crack propagation, corrosion of crack surfaces, presence of fluids in the crack, or roughness at cracked surfaces.

== Description ==
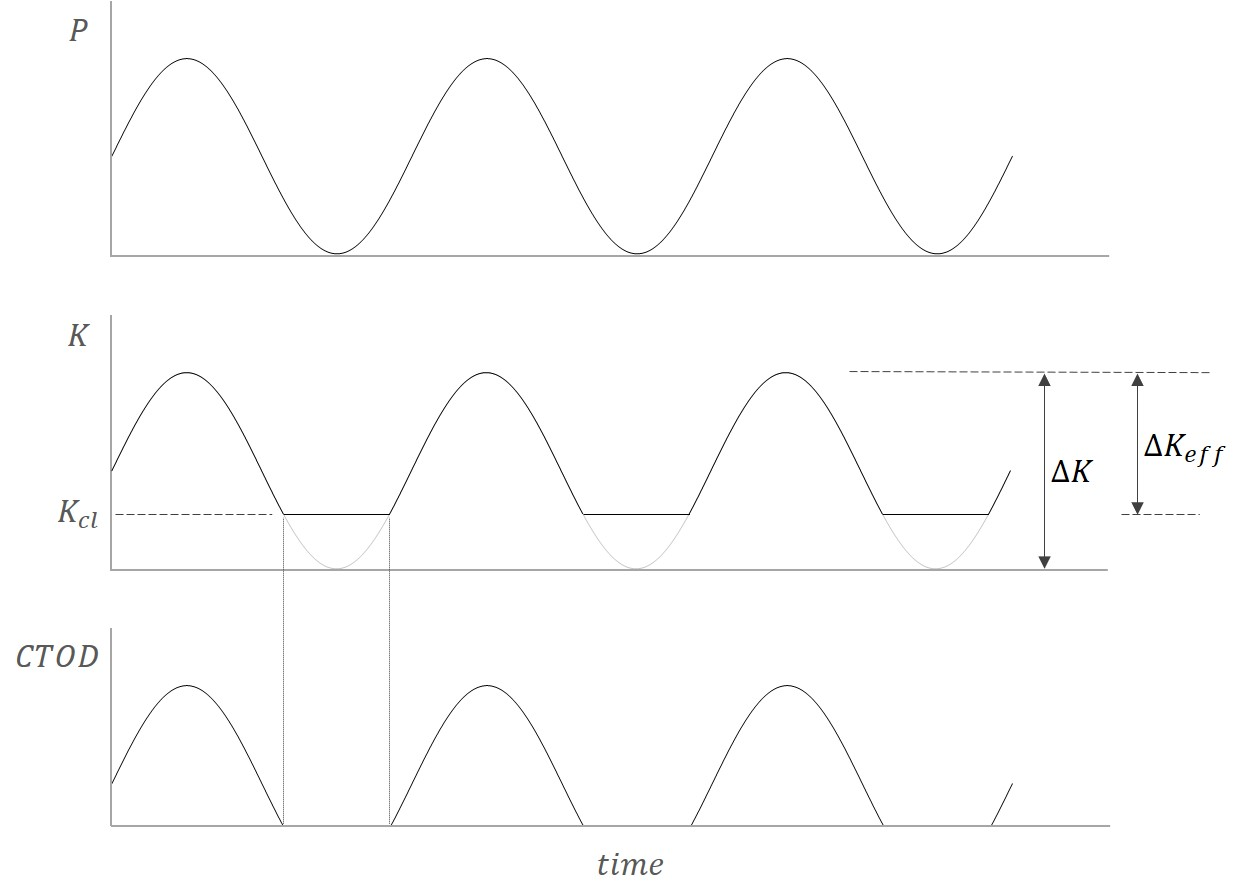
Crack closure effect (example of R=0)

During cyclic loading, a crack will open and close causing the crack tip opening displacement (CTOD) to vary cyclically in phase with the applied force. If the loading cycle includes a period of negative force or stress ratio $R$ (i.e. $R < 0$), the CTOD will remain equal to zero as the crack faces are pressed together. However, it was discovered that the CTOD can also be zero at other times even when the applied force is positive preventing the stress intensity factor reaching its minimum. Thus, the amplitude of the stress intensity factor range, also known as the crack tip driving force, is reduced relative to the case in which no closure occurs, thereby reducing the crack growth rate. The closure level increases with stress ratio and above approximately $R=0.7$, the crack faces do not contact and closure does not typically occur.

The applied load will generate a stress intensity factor at the crack tip, $K$ producing a crack tip opening displacement, CTOD. Crack growth is generally a function of the stress intensity factor range, $\Delta K$ for an applied loading cycle and is

$$\Delta K = K_\text{max} - K_\text{min}$$

However, crack closure occurs when the fracture surfaces are in contact below the opening level stress intensity factor $K < K_\text{op}$ even though under positive load, allowing us to define an effective stress intensity range $\Delta K_\text{eff}$ as

$$\Delta K_\text{eff} = K_\text{max} - K_\text{op}$$

which is less than the nominal applied $\Delta K$.

== History ==
The phenomenon of crack closure was first discovered by Elber in 1970. He observed that a contact between the fracture surfaces could take place even during cyclic tensile loading. The crack closure effect helps explain a wide range of fatigue data, and is especially important in the understanding of the effect of stress ratio (less closure at higher stress ratio) and short cracks (less closure than long cracks for the same cyclic stress intensity).

== Crack closure mechanisms ==
=== Plasticity-induced crack closure ===
The phenomenon of plasticity-induced crack closure is associated with the development of residual plastically deformed material on the flanks of an advancing fatigue crack.

The degree of plasticity at the crack tip is influenced by the level of material constraint. The two extreme cases are:

1. Under plane stress conditions, the piece of material in the plastic zone is elongated, which is mainly balanced by an out-of-the-plane flow of the material. Hence, the plasticity-induced crack closure under plane stress conditions can be expressed as a consequence of the stretched material behind the crack tip, which can be considered as a wedge that is inserted in the crack and reduces the cyclic plastic deformation at the crack tip and hence the fatigue crack growth rate.
2. Under plane strain conditions and constant load amplitudes, there is no plastic wedge at large distances behind the crack tip. However, the material in the plastic wake is plastically deformed. It is plastically sheared; this shearing induces a rotation of the original piece of material, and as a consequence, a local wedge is formed in the vicinity of the crack tip.

=== Phase-transformation-induced crack closure ===
Deformation-induced martensitic transformation in the stress field of the crack tip is another possible reason to cause crack closure. It was first studied by Pineau and Pelloux and Hornbogen in metastable austenitic stainless steels. These steels transform from the austenitic to the martensitic lattice structure under sufficiently high deformation, which leads to an increase of the material volume ahead of the crack tip. Therefore, compression stresses are likely to arise as the crack surfaces contact each other. This transformation-induced closure is strongly influenced by the size and geometry of the test specimen and of the fatigue crack.

=== Oxide-induced crack closure ===
Oxide-induced closure occurs where rapid corrosion occurs during crack propagation. It is caused when the base material at the fracture surface is exposed to gaseous and aqueous atmospheres and becomes oxidized. Although the oxidized layer is normally very thin, under continuous and repetitive deformation, the contaminated layer and the base material experience repetitive breaking, exposing even more of the base material, and thus produce even more oxides. The oxidized volume grows and is typically larger than the volume of the base material around the crack surfaces. As such, the volume of the oxides can be interpreted as a wedge inserted into the crack, reducing the effect stress intensity range. Experiments have shown that oxide-induced crack closure occurs at both room and elevated temperature, and the oxide build-up is more noticeable at low R-ratios and low (near-threshold) crack growth rates.

=== Roughness-induced crack closure ===
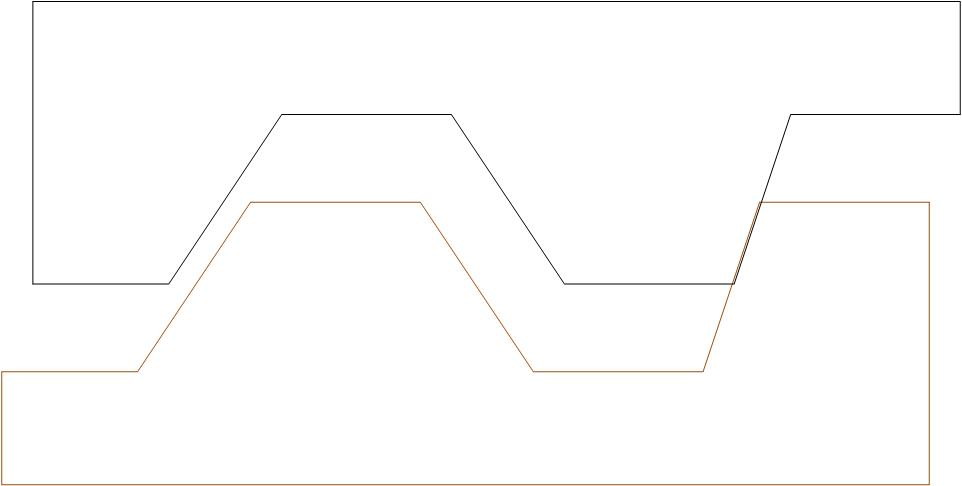
Misfit of fracture surfaces in roughness-induced crack closure

Roughness induced closure occurs with Mode II or in-plane shear type of loading, which is due to the misfit of the rough fracture surfaces of the crack’s upper and lower parts. Due to the anisotropy and heterogeneity in the micro structure, out-of-plane deformation occurs locally when Mode II loading is applied, and thus microscopic roughness of fatigue fracture surfaces is present. As a result, these mismatch wedges come into contact during the fatigue loading process, resulting in crack closure. The misfit in the fracture surfaces also takes place in the far field of the crack, which can be explained by the asymmetric displacement and rotation of material.

Roughness induced crack closure is justifiable or valid when the roughness of the surface is of same order as the crack opening displacement. It is influenced by such factors as grain size, loading history, material mechanical properties, load ratio and specimen type.
