= Crack tip opening displacement =

Crack-Tip Parameter Used in Fracture Mechanics

Diagram of crack tip opening displacement (CTOD)

Crack tip opening displacement (CTOD) or $\delta_\text{t}$ is the distance between the opposite faces of a crack tip at the 90° intercept position. The position behind the crack tip at which the distance is measured is arbitrary but commonly used is the point where two 45° lines, starting at the crack tip, intersect the crack faces. The parameter is used in fracture mechanics to characterize the loading on a crack and can be related to other crack tip loading parameters such as the stress intensity factor $K$ and the elastic-plastic J-integral.

For plane stress conditions, the CTOD can be written as:

$\delta_\text{t} = \left(\frac{8\sigma_\text{ys}a}{\pi E}\right)\ln\left[\sec\left(\frac{\pi \sigma^\infty}{2\sigma_\text{ys}}\right)\right]$

where $\sigma_\text{ys}$ is the yield stress, $a$ is the crack length, $E$ is the Young's modulus, and $\sigma^\infty$ is the remote applied stress.

Under fatigue loading, the range of movement of the crack tip during a loading cycle $\Delta\delta_\text{t}$ can be used for determining the rate of fatigue growth using a crack growth equation. The crack extension for a cycle $da/dN$, is typically of the order of $\Delta\delta_\text{t}$.

== History ==
Examination of fractured test specimens led to the observation that the crack faces had moved apart prior to fracture, due to the blunting of an initially sharp crack by plastic deformation. The degree of crack blunting increased in proportion to the toughness of the material. This observation led to considering the opening at the crack tip as a measure of fracture toughness. The COD was originally independently proposed by Alan Cottrell and A. A. Wells. This parameter became known as CTOD. G. R. Irwin later postulated that crack-tip plasticity makes the crack behave as if it were slightly longer. Thus, estimation of CTOD can be done by solving for the displacement at the physical crack tip.

== Use as a design parameter ==
CTOD is a single parameter that accommodates crack tip plasticity. It is easy to measure when compared with techniques such as J integral. It is a fracture parameter that has more physical meaning than the rest.

However, the equivalence of CTOD and J integral is proven only for non-linear materials, but not for plastic materials. It is hard to expand the concept of CTOD for large deformations. It is easier to calculate J-integral in case of a design process using finite element method techniques.

== Relation with other crack tip parameters ==
=== K and CTOD ===
CTOD can be expressed in terms of stress intensity factor $K$ as:

$$\delta_\text{t} = \frac{4}{\pi}\frac{K^2}{m\sigma_\text{y} E}$$

where $\sigma_\text{y}$ is the yield strength, $E$ is Young's modulus and $m=1$ for plane stress and $m=2$ for plane strain.

=== G and CTOD ===
CTOD can be related to the energy release rate G as:

$\delta_t= \frac{4}{\pi} \frac{G}{\sigma_{y}}$

=== J-integral and CTOD ===
The relationship between the CTOD and J is given by:

$$\delta_\text{t} = d_n \frac{J}{\sigma_\text{y}}$$

where the variable $d_n$ is typically between 0.3 and 0.8.

== Testing ==
A CTOD test is usually done on materials that undergo plastic deformation prior to failure. The testing material more or less resembles the original one, although dimensions can be reduced proportionally. Loading is done to resemble the expected load. More than 3 tests are done to minimize any experimental deviations. The dimensions of the testing material must maintain proportionality. The specimen is placed on the work table and a notch is created exactly at the centre. The crack should be generated such that the defect length is about half the depth. The load applied on the specimen is generally a three-point bending load. A type of strain gauge called a crack-mouth clip gage is used to measure the crack opening. The crack tip plastically deforms until a critical point after which a cleavage crack is initiated that may lead to either partial or complete failure. The critical load and strain gauge measurements at the load are noted and a graph is plotted. The crack tip opening can be calculated from the length of the crack and opening at the mouth of the notch. According to the material used, the fracture can be brittle or ductile which can be concluded from the graph.

Standards for CTOD testing can be found in the ASTM E1820 - 20a code.

=== Laboratory measurement ===
Early experiments used a flat, paddle-shaped gauge that was inserted into the crack; as the crack opens, the paddle gauge rotates and an electronic signal is sent to an x–y plotter. This method was inaccurate, however, because it was difficult to reach the crack tip with the paddle gauge. Today, the displacement V at the crack mouth is measured and the CTOD is inferred by assuming that the specimen halves are rigid and rotate about a hinge point.
