= Mode III =

Mode III may refer to:

- Mousterian or Mode III, archaeological culture's method of fabricating flint tools
- Mode III crack or tearing mode of propagation of a fracture
