= Paul C. Paris =

American academic (1930–2017)

- Born: August 7, 1930; New York, New York, USA
- Died: January 15, 2017 (aged 86)
- Education: Lehigh University
- Occupation: Professor of Mechanical Engineering
- Employer: Washington University in St. Louis
- Notable work: Paris' law

Paul Croce Paris (August 7, 1930 - January 15, 2017) was an American academic, engineering consultant and researcher in the field of mechanics and fatigue. He was known particularly for introducing fracture mechanics methods to the aviation industry, and for the empirical Paris' law relating crack growth rate to the amplitude of the stress intensity factor.

== Career ==
Paris was trained in applied mechanics at Lehigh University. He was a faculty associate at Boeing in the summer of 1955, where he investigated the Comet fatigue (material) failure. His first paper on fracture mechanics was famously rejected by top journals. Paris joined the McKelvey School of Engineering at Washington University in St. Louis in 1976. In 2009 he became a professor emeritus and continued to teach.

== Awards ==
- Honorary Doctorate from Paris Nanterre University
- 2003 Crichlow Trust Prize by the American Institute of Aeronautics and Astronautics
- 2009 George Irwin Gold Medal by the International Congress on Fracture at Ottawa, Canada
- 2016 August Wöhler Medal by the European Structural Integrity Society (ESIS)
