= Mode II =

Mode II may refer to:

- Acheulean or Mode II, archaeological culture's method of fabricating flint tools
- Mode II crack or sliding mode of propagation of a fracture
