= Hiroshi Tada (engineer) =

Japanese engineer and juggler (1939–2021)

- Born: 1939; Kyushu, Japan
- Died: 19 February 2021 (aged 81–82)
- Occupation: Professor of Mechanical Engineering
- Notable work: Stress Analysis of Cracks Handbook

Hiroshi Tada (1939 – 19 February 2021) was a Japanese mechanical engineer with highly notable works in the field of fracture mechanics. He was also well known as a performer of a Japanese style of top spinning known as koma-mawashi.

== Koma-mawashi performances ==
Although koma-mawashi (駒回し) is traditionally a children's play activity in Japan, Tada performed this art at an expert level and included in his act elements of juggling, yo-yo and magic, with some comedy thrown in. He was a regular performer at many festivals in the St. Louis, Missouri area, such as the Missouri Botanical Garden's Japanese Festival, Missouri History Museum's International FunFest, Queeny Park's International Folk Fest, and Tower Grove Park's Festival of Nations.

== Personal and professional life and death ==
Hiroshi Tada was born in Kyushu, Japan. He graduated from the University of Tokyo and moved to the United States to obtain his PhD. He spent most of his life in St. Louis, Missouri. Tada was an affiliate professor of mechanical engineering at the McKelvey School of Engineering at Washington University in St. Louis and co-author of Stress Analysis of Cracks Handbook.

Tada died on 19 February 2021, at the age of 81–82.
