= Tatsuo Endo (engineer) =

Japanese engineer

Tatsuo Endo (遠藤 達雄, Endō Tatsuo; 1925 – 1989) was a Japanese engineer. In 1968, while a visiting professor at the University of Illinois, he developed the rainflow-counting algorithm for fatigue analysis of structures, along with M. Matsuishi.

== Bibliography ==
- Matsuishi, M.; Endo, T. (1968). "Fatigue of metals subjected to varying stress". Japan Society of Mechanical Engineering.
