= Damage tolerance =

Ability of a structure to withstand defects safely until it can be repaired

In engineering, damage tolerance is a property of a structure relating to its ability to sustain defects safely until repair can be effected. The approach to engineering design to account for damage tolerance is based on the assumption that flaws can exist in any structure and such flaws propagate with usage. This approach is commonly used in aerospace engineering, mechanical engineering, and civil engineering to manage the extension of cracks in structures through the application of the principles of fracture mechanics. A structure is considered to be damage tolerant if a maintenance program has been implemented that will result in the detection and repair of accidental damage, corrosion and fatigue cracking before such damage reduces the residual strength of the structure below an acceptable limit.

== History ==
Structures upon which human life depends have long been recognized as needing an element of fail-safety. When describing his flying machine, Leonardo da Vinci noted that "In constructing wings one should make one chord to bear the strain and a looser one in the same position so that if one breaks under the strain, the other is in the position to serve the same function."

Prior to the 1970s, the prevailing engineering philosophy of aircraft structures was to ensure that airworthiness was maintained with a single part broken, a redundancy requirement known as fail-safety. However, advances in fracture mechanics, along with infamous catastrophic fatigue failures such as those in the de Havilland Comet prompted a change in requirements for aircraft. It was discovered that a phenomenon known as multiple-site damage could cause many small cracks in the structure, which grow slowly by themselves, to join one another over time, creating a much larger crack, and significantly reducing the expected time until failure

== Safe-life structure ==
Not all structure must demonstrate detectable crack propagation to ensure safety of operation. Some structures operate under the safe-life design principle, where an extremely low level of risk is accepted through a combination of testing and analysis that the part will never form a detectable crack due to fatigue during the service life of the part. This is achieved through a significant reduction of stresses below the typical fatigue capability of the part. Safe-life structures are employed when the cost or infeasibility of inspections outweighs the weight penalty and development costs associated with safe-life structures. An example of a safe-life component is the helicopter rotor blade. Due to the extremely large numbers of cycles endured by the rotating component, an undetectable crack may grow to a critical length in a single flight and before the aircraft lands, result in a catastrophic failure that regular maintenance could not have prevented.

== Damage tolerance analysis ==
In ensuring the continued safe operation of the damage tolerant structure, inspection schedules are devised. This schedule is based on many criteria, including:

- assumed initial damaged condition of the structure
- stresses in the structure (both fatigue and operational maximum stresses) that cause crack growth from the damaged condition
- geometry of the material which intensifies or reduces the stresses on the crack tip
- ability of the material to withstand cracking due to stresses in the expected environment
- largest crack size that the structure can endure before catastrophic failure
- likelihood that a particular inspection method will reveal a crack
- acceptable level of risk that a certain structure will be completely failed
- expected duration after manufacture until a detectable crack will form
- assumption of failure in adjacent components which may have the effect of changing stresses in the structure of interest

These factors affect how long the structure may operate normally in the damaged condition before one or more inspection intervals has the opportunity to discover the damaged state and effect a repair. The interval between inspections must be selected with a certain minimum safety, and also must balance the expense of the inspections, the weight penalty of lowering fatigue stresses, and the opportunity costs associated with a structure being out of service for maintenance.

== Non-destructive inspections ==
Manufacturers and operators of aircraft, trains, and civil engineering structures like bridges have a financial interest in ensuring that the inspection schedule is as cost-efficient as possible. In the example of aircraft, because these structures are often revenue producing, there is an opportunity cost associated with the maintenance of the aircraft (lost ticket revenue), in addition to the cost of maintenance itself. Thus, this maintenance is desired to be performed infrequently, even when such increased intervals cause increased complexity and cost to the overhaul. Crack growth, as shown by fracture mechanics, is exponential in nature; meaning that the crack growth rate is a function of an exponent of the current crack size (see Paris' law). This means that only the largest cracks influence the overall strength of a structure; small internal damages do not necessarily decrease the strength. A desire for infrequent inspection intervals, combined with the exponential growth of cracks in structure has led to the development of non-destructive testing methods which allow inspectors to look for very tiny cracks which are often invisible to the naked eye. Examples of this technology include eddy current, ultrasonic, dye penetrant, and X-ray inspections. By catching structural cracks when they are very small, and growing slowly, these non-destructive inspections can reduce the amount of maintenance checks, and allow damage to be caught when it is small, and still inexpensive to repair. As an example, such repair can be achieved by drilling a small hole at the crack tip, thus effectively turning the crack into a keyhole-notch.
