= George Rankin Irwin =

American scientist

George Rankin Irwin ForMemRS
- Born: February 26, 1907; El Paso, Texas
- Died: 9 October 1998 (aged 91)
- Education: Knox College and University of Illinois at Urbana-Champaign
- Known for: Stress Intensity Factor
- Scientific career
- Fields: Fracture mechanics and Strength of materials
- Workplaces: US Naval Research Laboratory, Lehigh University and University of Maryland, College Park

George Rankin Irwin ForMemRS, (February 26, 1907 – October 9, 1998) was an American scientist in the field of fracture mechanics and strength of materials. He is known for defining the stress intensity factor, $K$, which is used to characterise the state of stress around a crack tip. When this value exceeds the fracture toughness of a material $K_{Ic}$ the crack will rapidly propagate.

== Early life and education ==
George R. Irwin was born in El Paso, Texas. His family moved to Springfield, Illinois where he went to school.

He attended Knox College in Galesburg, Illinois and earned an A.B. degree in English in 1930. After an additional year studying physics, he transferred to the University of Illinois at Urbana-Champaign where he studied from 1931 to 1935. He received his Ph.D. from the University of Illinois in 1937; his thesis was on the mass ratio of lithium isotopes.

== Career ==
In 1937 he joined the US Naval Research Laboratory (NRL) in Washington D.C. where he worked until 1967. There he worked on ballistics, specifically on the mechanics of projectiles penetrating targets. Here he developed methods for determining the penetration force that a projectile exerts on its target. This work was completed throughout the Second World War. Part of this work led to the development of several nonmetallic armors (see vehicle armor). This coupled with his observation that thick armor plate made from ductile material (such as steel) failed in a brittle manner during test firings initiated his interest in brittle fracture.

In 1946 he was made responsible for the project on brittle fracture at the NRL and in 1948 he was promoted from the head of the Ballistics Branch of the NRL to associate superintendent of the Mechanics Division. In 1950 he was again promoted to superintendent of the Mechanics Division. He served in that capacity until his retirement from government service in 1967.

The classical approach to brittle fracture in the late 1940s had been developed in the early 1920s, following the work of A. A. Griffith. Griffith had shown that an instability criterion could be derived for cracks in brittle materials based on the variation of potential energy of the structure as the crack grew. The Griffith approach was global and could not easily be extended to accommodate structures with finite geometries subjected to various types of loadings. The theory was considered to apply only to a limited class of extremely brittle materials, such as glasses or ceramics. Irwin observed that the fracture process in metals involved nonelastic work at the crack tip. This observation permitted him to modify the Griffith theory by incorporating a plastic work of fracture in addition to the classical surface energy of crack formation.

As part of this work, Irwin defined the fundamental concept of a Stress Intensity Factor and the critical plane-strain stress intensity factor ($K_{IC}$) which is a material property.

He was involved in the development of several standards and led several committees for the American Society for Testing and Materials (ASTM).

In 1967, Irwin was recruited to Lehigh University as the Boeing University Professor by long-time collaborator Paul C. Paris, the father of modern methods for predicting crack growth and its control in aircraft structures. Irwin served for five years before reaching mandatory retirement age. In his tenure, he continued his collaboration with Paris, and collaborated with, influenced, or assisted many notable individuals in the fracture mechanics community, including:

- F. Erdogan on cracks in thin-walled shell structures;
- A. A. Wells of the British Welding Institute on characterizing fracture in normally ductile steel structures;
- F. A. McClintock, Massachusetts Institute of Technology and John W. Hutchinson, Harvard University, on the development of fracture mechanics procedures in the presence of substantial ductility;
- James R. Rice, Harvard University, on developing the J integral approach for characterizing the onset of crack growth in ductile materials;
- L. B. Freund, Brown University, and M. F. Kanninen, Southwest Research Institute, on the dynamics of inertial limited crack propagation and arrest.

In 1972, Irwin joined the faculty of the University of Maryland, College Park where he worked in the field of dynamic fracture, specifically concerned with crack arrest and the implications in a loss-of-coolant accident in a nuclear power plant. He contributed to The Stress Analysis of Cracks Handbook.

== Memberships and honours ==
Irwin was a member of the America National Academy of Engineering and a Foreign Member of the Royal Society of London.

Additionally, he received the following honours:-

- 1946 - Naval Distinguished Civilian Service Award
- 1947 - Knox College Alumni Achievement Award
- 1959 - ASTM Charles B. Dudley Medal
- 1960 - RESA Award for Applied Research
- 1961 - Ford Foundation Visiting Professorship, University of Illinois
- 1966 - ASTM Award of Merit
- 1966 - American Society of Mechanical Engineers (ASME) Robert Henry Thurston Lecture Award
- 1967 - Fellow, ASTM
- 1969 - University of Illinois Engineering Achievement Award
- 1969 - U. S. Navy Conrad Award
- 1969 - Alumni Achievement Award, University of Illinois
- 1973 - SESA Murray Lectureship Award
- 1974 - Lehigh University Academic Leadership Award
- 1974 - ASTM honorary member
- 1974 - American Society for Metals Sauveur Award
- 1976 - The Grande Medaille Award of the French Metallurgical Society of France
- 1977 - ASME Nadai Award
- 1977 - B. J. Lazan Award from the Society for Experimental Mechanics
- 1977 - Honorary degree, doctor of engineering, Lehigh University
- 1977 - Election to the National Academy of Engineering
- 1978 - ASTM-Irwin Award
- 1979 - Francis J. Clamer Clauier Medal of the Franklin Institute
- 1982 - Governor's Citation for Distinguished Service to Maryland
- 1982 - Tetmajer Award of the Technical University of Vienna, Austria
- 1985 - Fellow, Society for Experimental Mechanics
- 1986 - ASME Timoshenko Medal
- 1987 - ASM Gold Medal for Outstanding Contributions to Engineering and Science
- 1987 - Elected to foreign membership, British Royal Society
- 1988 - ASTM Fracture Mechanics Award and the George R. Irwin Medal
- 1989 - Honorary membership in Deutscher Verband für Material Prufung
- 1990 - Honorary membership in the American Ceramic Society
- 1990 - Albert Sauveur Lecture Award
- 1992 - George R. Irwin Research Award, University of Maryland
- 1993 - Engineering Innovation Hall of Fame at the University of Maryland
- 1998 - A. James Clark Outstanding Commitment Award University of Maryland
- 1998 - Appointed Glenn L. Martin Institute Professor of Engineering
