= Kirsch (surname) =

Kirsch is a German surname. Notable people with the surname include:

- Adam Kirsch (born 1976), an American book critic and writer
- Alex Kirsch (born 1992), a Luxembourgish cyclist
- Arthur Kirsch (born 1932), an American literary critic
- Benedikt Kirsch (born 1996), a German footballer
- Billy Kirsch, an American songwriter and consultant
- Brandon Kirsch (born 1983), an American football player
- David Kirsch, an American oncologist
- Delbert Kirsch, a Canadian politician
- Don Kirsch (1920–1970), an American college baseball coach
- Drew Kirsch, an American director
- Dwight Kirsch (1899–1981), an American artist
- Edmund Kirsch (1866–1954), a Czech businessman and translator
- Ernst Gustav Kirsch (1841–1901), a German engineer
- Florence Kirsch Du Brul (1915–2005), an American pianist
- Harry Kirsch (1887–1925), an American baseball player
- Helene Kirsch (1906–1999), a German politician
- Ingo Kirsch, an East German canoeist
- Irving Kirsch (born 1943), an American professor of psychology
- Joe Kirsch, alternate name of Joseph Kish (1899–1969), an American set decorator
- Johann Peter Kirsch (1861–1941), a Luxembourgish ecclesiastical historian
- Johanna Kirsch (1856–1907), a German painter
- Johny Kirsch (born 1944), a Luxembourgish footballer
- Jonathan Kirsch, an American author, lawyer and columnist
- Karen Kirsch (born 1968), an American politician
- Marilyn Kirsch (born 1950), an American artist
- Melissa Kirsch (born 1974), an American author
- Nicolas Kirsch (1901–1983), a Luxembourgish footballer
- Olga Kirsch (1924–1997), a South African-Israeli poet
- Patrick Kirsch (born 1981), a German footballer
- Philippe Kirsch (born 1947), a Canadian lawyer
- Rainer Kirsch (1934–2015), a German writer and poet
- Randell Kirsch, an American singer and songwriter
- Raymond Kirsch (1942–2013), a Luxembourgian businessman
- Robert Kirsch (1922–1980), an American literary critic and author
- Robert Kirsch (judge) (born 1966), an American judge
- Roman Kirsch (born 1988), a German entrepreneur
- Russell Kirsch (1929–2020), created America’s first internally programmable computer and first digital image
- Sarah Kirsch (1935–2013), a German poet
- Stan Kirsch (1968–2020), an American actor
- Steve Kirsch (born 1956), an American inventor
- Theodor Franz Wilhelm Kirsch (1818–1889), a German entomologist who specialised in Coleoptera
- Thomas Kirsch (born 1974), an American attorney and judge
- Thomas D. Kirsch (born 1957), an American physician and scientist
- Vanessa Kirsch, an American entrepreneur
- Werner Kirsch (1938–2017), a German boxer

== See also ==
- Kirch (disambiguation)
