= Kirsch (disambiguation) =

Kirsch is a fruit brandy.

Kirsch may also refer to:

- Kirsch equations
- Kirsch (surname), a surname (and list of people with the name)
- Kirsch (Longuich), a part of Longuich, Rhineland-Palatinate, Germany
