= Longitudinal =

Longitudinal is a geometric term of location which may refer to:

- Longitude
  - Line of longitude, also called a meridian
- Longitudinal engine, an internal combustion engine in which the crankshaft is oriented along the long axis of the vehicle, front to back
- Longitudinal mode, a particular standing wave pattern of a resonant cavity formed by waves confined in the cavity
- Longitudinal redundancy check, in telecommunication, a form of redundancy check that is applied independently to each of a parallel group of bit streams.
- Longitudinal study, a research study that involves repeated observations of the same items over long periods of time — often many decades
- Longitudinal voltage, in telecommunication, a voltage induced or appearing along the length of a transmission medium
- Longitudinal wave, a wave with oscillations or vibrations along or parallel to their direction of travel
- Longitudinal/longitudinally are also anatomical terms of location.

== See also ==
- Latitudinal
- Longitude
- Longitudinal axis (disambiguation)
- Transversality
