= ESCR =

ESCR may stand for:

- Economic, Social and Cultural Rights
- Embryonic stem cell research
- Environmental Stress Crack Resistance
- ES Cannet Rocheville, a French football club
