= Imaginary line =

Mathematical curve which does not physically exist

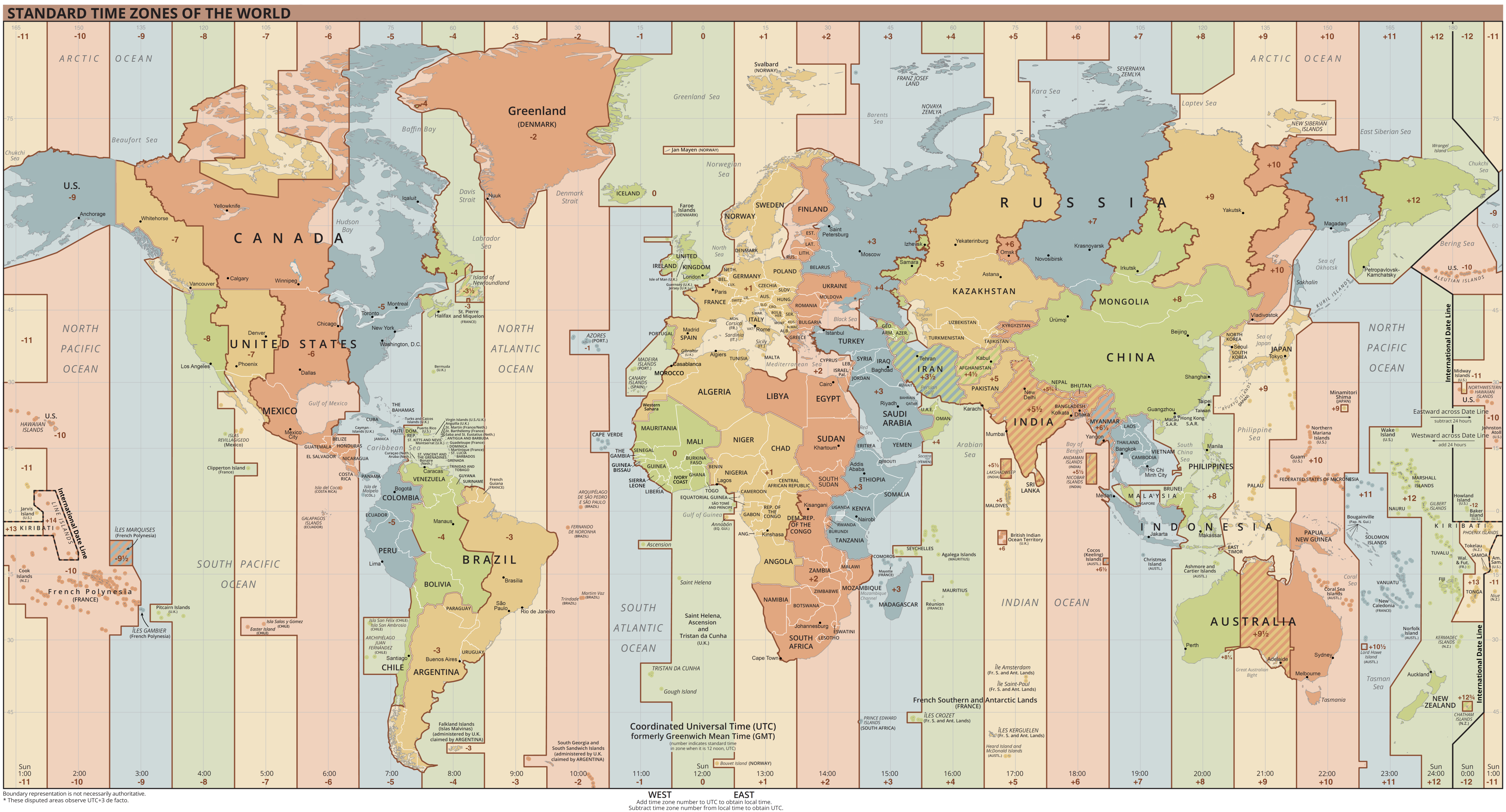
Time zone borders are an example of imaginary lines.

In general, an imaginary line is usually any sort of geometric line (more generally, curves) that has only an abstract definition and does not physically exist. They are often used to properly identify places on a map.

Some outside geography do exist. A centerline is a nautical term for a line down the center of a vessel lengthwise.

== Examples ==
=== Geography ===
As a geographical concept, an imaginary line may serve as an arbitrary division, such as

- Antarctic Circle
- Arctic Circle
- Border
- International Date Line
- Latitude, including the Equator, the Tropic of Capricorn and the Tropic of Cancer
- Longitude, the Prime Meridian Any axis about which an object spins is an imaginary line.
- Mason–Dixon line, which informally marks pieces of the borders of four U.S. states: Delaware, Maryland, Pennsylvania, and West Virginia, once part of Virginia. Symbolically, the line separates the Northern United States from the Southern United States
- Missouri Compromise Line
- Time zones

=== Science and engineering ===
- Line of sight
- Optical ray
- Force lines in mechanical and structural engineering
- Field lines for electric and magnetic fields

== See also ==
- Imaginary line (mathematics)
