= Kirch =

Kirch may refer to:

== People ==
- Darrell Kirch, AAMC president
- Gottfried Kirch (1639–1710), German astronomer
- Maria Margarethe Kirch (née Winckelmann) (1670–1720), German astronomer and spouse of Gottfried Kirch
- Leo Kirch (1926–2011), German media entrepreneur
- Oliver Kirch (born 1982), German footballer
- Patrick Vinton Kirch, American archaeologist

== Other uses ==
- Kirch Group, a former German media conglomerate
- Kirch (crater), a lunar impact crater
- Kirch, Iran, a village in Isfahan Province

== See also ==
- Kirch Jesar, a municipality in the district of Ludwigslust in Mecklenburg-Vorpommern, Germany
- Kirch Mulsow, a municipality in the district of Bad Doberan in Mecklenburg-Vorpommern, Germany
- Kirsch (disambiguation)
- Kerch
