= Environmental stress fracture =

Material failure

In materials science, environmental stress fracture or environment assisted fracture is the generic name given to premature failure under the influence of tensile stresses and harmful environments of materials such as metals and alloys, composites, plastics and ceramics.

Metals and alloys exhibit phenomena such as stress corrosion cracking, hydrogen embrittlement, liquid metal embrittlement and corrosion fatigue all coming under this category. Environments such as moist air, sea water and corrosive liquids and gases cause environmental stress fracture. Metal matrix composites are also susceptible to many of these processes.

Plastics and plastic-based composites may suffer swelling, debonding and loss of strength when exposed to organic fluids and other corrosive environments, such as acids and alkalies. Under the influence of stress and environment, many structural materials, particularly the high-specific strength ones become brittle and lose their resistance to fracture. While their fracture toughness remains unaltered, their threshold stress intensity factor for crack propagation may be considerably lowered. Consequently, they become prone to premature fracture because of sub-critical crack growth. This article aims to give a brief overview of the various degradation processes mentioned above.

== Stress corrosion cracking ==
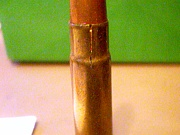
A .35 Remington brass cartridge that has experienced season cracking.

Stress corrosion cracking is a phenomenon where a synergistic action of corrosion and tensile stress leads to brittle fracture of normally ductile materials at generally lower stress levels. During stress corrosion cracking, the material is relatively unattacked by the corrosive agent (no general corrosion, only localized corrosion), but fine cracks form within it. This process has serious implications on the utilisation of the material because the applicable safe stress levels are drastically reduced in the corrosive medium. Season cracking and caustic embrittlement are two stress corrosion cracking processes which affected the serviceability of brass cartridge cases and riveted steel boilers respectively.

== Hydrogen embrittlement ==
Small quantities of hydrogen present inside certain metallic materials make the latter brittle and susceptible to sub-critical crack growth under stress. Hydrogen embrittlement may occur as a side effect of electroplating processes.

Delayed failure is the fracture of a component under stress after an elapsed time, is a characteristic feature of hydrogen embrittlement (2). Hydrogen entry into the material may be effected during plating, pickling, phosphating, melting, casting or welding. Corrosion during service in moist environments generates hydrogen, part of which may enter the metal as atomic hydrogen (H^{•}) and cause embrittlement. Presence of a tensile stress, either inherent or externally applied, is necessary for metals to be damaged. As in the case of stress corrosion cracking, hydrogen embrittlement may also lead to a decrease in the threshold stress intensity factor for crack propagation or an increase in the sub-critical crack growth velocity of the material. The most visible effect of hydrogen in materials is a drastic reduction in ductility during tensile tests. It may increase, decrease or leave unaffected the yield strength of the material.

Hydrogen may also cause serrated yielding in certain metals such as niobium, nickel and some steels (3).

== Case studies ==
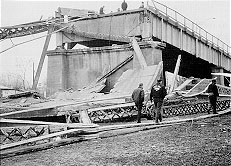
The collapsed Silver Bridge, as seen from the Ohio side

One of the worst disasters caused by stress corrosion cracking was the fall of the Silver Bridge, WV in 1967, when a single brittle crack formed by rusting grew to criticality. The crack was on one of the tie bar links of one of the suspension chains, and the whole joint failed quickly by overload. The event escalated and the whole bridge disappeared in less than a minute, killing 46 drivers or passengers on the bridge at the time.

== See also ==
- Crocodile cracking – Distress in asphalt pavement
- Environmental stress cracking – Brittle failure of thermoplastic polymers
- Forensic engineering – Investigation of failures associated with legal intervention
- Fracture mechanics – Study of propagation of cracks in materials
- Season cracking – Form of stress-corrosion cracking of brass cartridge cases
- Stress corrosion cracking – Growth of cracks in a corrosive environment
- Structural integrity and failure – Ability of a structure to support a designed structural load without breaking
