= Force lines =

Force lines is a method used in solid mechanics for visualization of internal forces in a deformed body. A force line is a curve representing graphically the internal force acting within a body across imaginary internal surfaces. The force lines show the maximal internal forces and their directions.

== Force lines drawing ==
The procedure for determining the force lines consists of two stages:

1) Defining the internal surface. The surface is perpendicular to maximum principal stress in every point of the solid.

2) Integration of internal stresses on the surface. Stress is a measure of the average amount of force exerted per unit area. The stress distribution can be obtained from known theoretical or numerical (Finite element method) analysis.

The researcher who builds up the force lines can choose a magnitude of the internal force and the initial border where the drawing procedure starts.

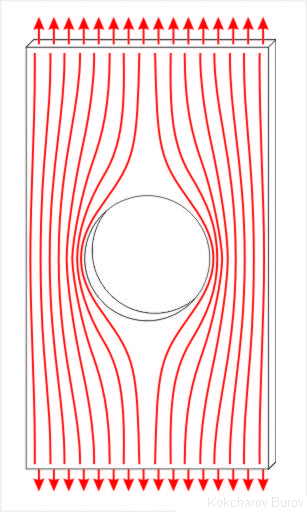
Figure 1. Force lines in a plate with a hole.

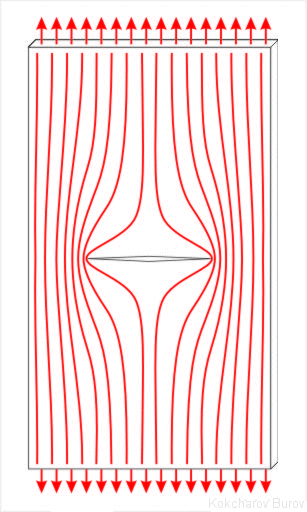
Figure 2. Force lines in a plate with a central crack.

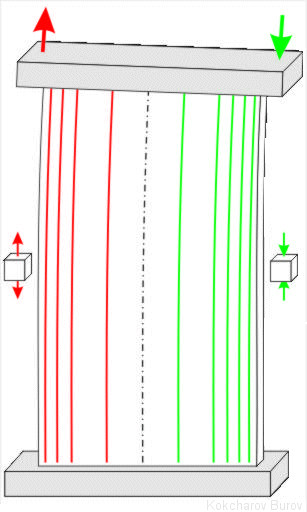
Figure 3. Force lines in a beam under pure bending.

Figure 1 shows an example of force lines in a body with a hole under tension. The force lines are denser near the hole. The visualization helps to explain the stress concentration.

Figure 2 shows the force lines in a body with a crack. The cracks are the most dangerous stress concentrator: the intensity of the force lines is high in the crack tip (see Fracture mechanics).

Figure 3 shows the case of pure bending of a beam with rectangular cross section. There are no internal forces at the neutral axis of the beam. The tensile and compressive force lines are symmetrical and are denser at the beam’s edge.

== Application ==
The force lines pictures are used for

1) Analysis of stress concentration (Figure1 and Figure 2): the number of the force lines increases in areas with stress concentration.

2) Optimization of structures: reinforcing the structure in the areas with concentration of force lines and deleting the components where there are no force lines.

== See also ==
- Fracture
- Engineering stress
- Stress concentration
- Stress intensity factor
- Strength of materials
- Structural fracture mechanics
