= Stress corrosion cracking =

Growth of cracks in a corrosive environment

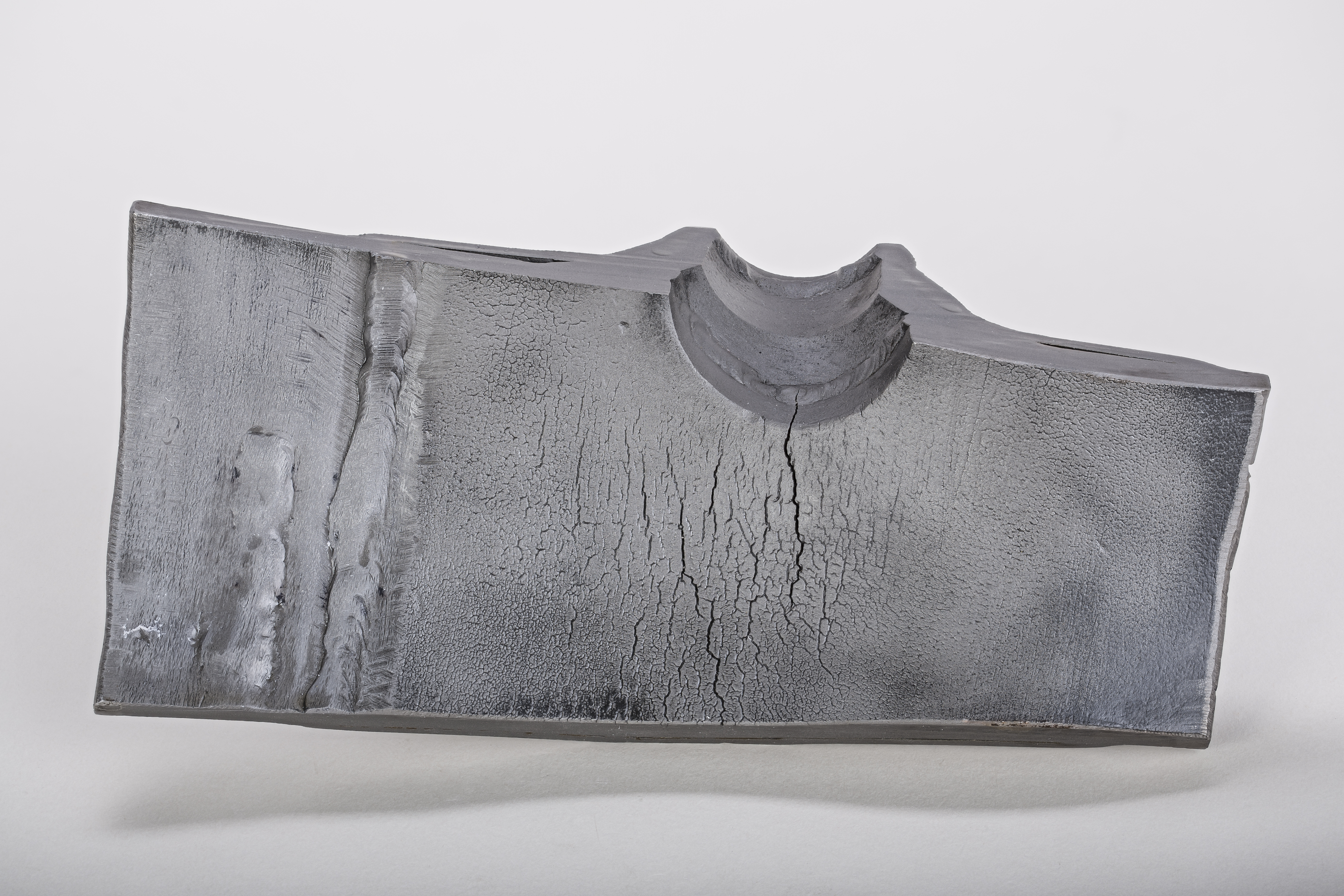
Stress corrosion cracking caused by tension developed in an unsuitably welded reinforcement collar

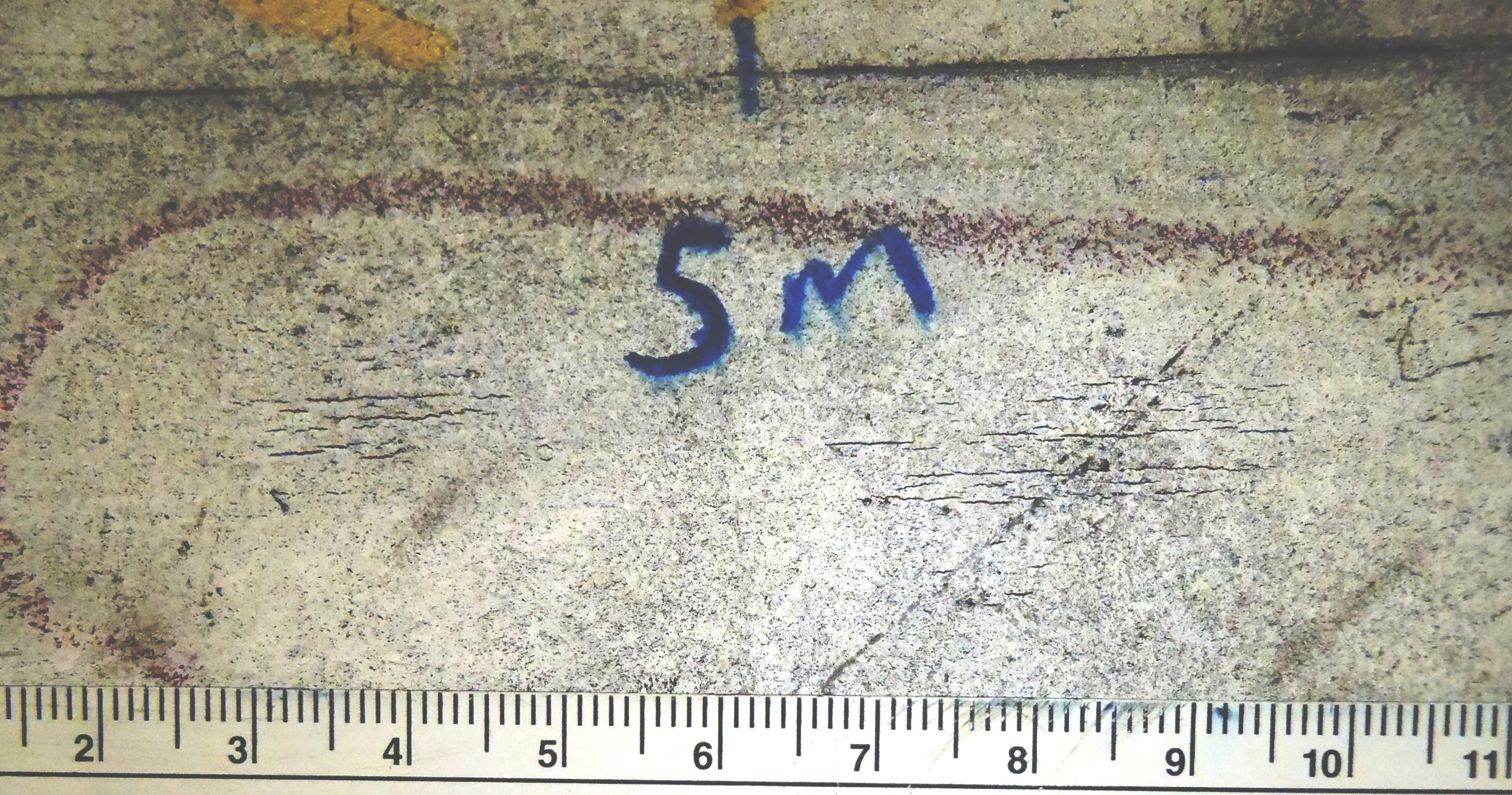
A close-up of the surface of a steel pipeline showing stress corrosion cracking (two clusters of small black lines) revealed by magnetic particle inspection. Cracks which would normally have been invisible are detectable due to the magnetic particles clustering at the crack openings. The scale at the bottom is in centimeters (each division indicates a millimeter).

Stress corrosion cracking (SCC) is the growth of crack formation in a corrosive environment. It can lead to unexpected and sudden failure of normally ductile metal alloys subjected to a tensile stress, especially at elevated temperature. SCC is highly chemically specific in that certain alloys are likely to undergo SCC only when exposed to a small number of chemical environments. The chemical environment that causes SCC for a given alloy is often one which is only mildly corrosive to the metal. Hence, metal parts with severe SCC can appear bright and shiny, while being filled with microscopic cracks. This factor makes it common for SCC to go undetected prior to failure. SCC often progresses rapidly, and is more common among alloys than pure metals. The specific environment is of crucial importance, and only very small concentrations of certain highly active chemicals are needed to produce catastrophic cracking, often leading to devastating and unexpected failure.

The stresses can be the result of the crevice loads due to stress concentration, or can be caused by the type of assembly or residual stresses from fabrication (e.g. cold working); the residual stresses can be relieved by annealing or other surface treatments. Unexpected and premature failure of chemical process equipment, for example, due to stress corrosion cracking constitutes a serious hazard in terms of safety of personnel, operating facilities and the environment. By weakening the reliability of these types of equipment, such failures also adversely affect productivity and profitability.

== Mechanisms ==
Stress corrosion cracking mainly affects metals and metallic alloys. A comparable effect also known as environmental stress cracking also affects other materials such as polymers, ceramics and glass.

=== Metals ===
Lower pH and lower applied redox potential facilitate the evolution and the enrichment of hydrogen during the process of SCC, thus increasing the SCC intensity.

Alloy	K_{Ic} MN/m^{3/2}	SCC environment	K_{Iscc} MN/m^{3/2}
13Cr steel	60	3% NaCl	12
18Cr-8Ni	200	42% MgCl_{2}	10
Cu-30Zn	200	NH_{4}OH (pH 7)	1
Al-3Mg-7Zn	25	Aqueous halides	5
Ti-6Al-1V	60	0.6 M KCl	20

- Certain austenitic stainless steels and aluminium alloys crack in the presence of chlorides. This limits the usefulness of austenitic stainless steel for containing water with higher than a few parts per million content of chlorides at temperatures above 50 °C (122 °F);
- mild steel cracks in the presence of alkali (e.g. boiler cracking and caustic stress corrosion cracking) and nitrates;
- copper alloys crack in ammoniacal solutions (season cracking);
- high-tensile steels have been known to crack in an unexpectedly brittle manner in a whole variety of aqueous environments, especially when chlorides are present.

With the possible exception of the latter, which is a special example of hydrogen cracking, all the others display the phenomenon of subcritical crack growth, i.e. small surface flaws propagate (usually smoothly) under conditions where fracture mechanics predicts that failure should not occur. That is, in the presence of a corrodent, cracks develop and propagate well below critical stress intensity factor ($K_\mathrm{Ic}$). The subcritical value of the stress intensity, designated as $K_\mathrm{Iscc}$, may be less than 1% of $K_\mathrm{Ic}$.

=== Polymers ===
A similar process (environmental stress cracking) occurs in polymers, when products are exposed to specific solvents or aggressive chemicals such as acids and alkalis. As with metals, attack is confined to specific polymers and particular chemicals. Thus polycarbonate is sensitive to attack by alkalis, but not by acids. On the other hand, polyesters are readily degraded by acids, and SCC is a likely failure mechanism. Polymers are susceptible to environmental stress cracking where attacking agents do not necessarily degrade the materials chemically. Nylon is sensitive to degradation by acids, a process known as hydrolysis, and nylon mouldings will crack when attacked by strong acids.

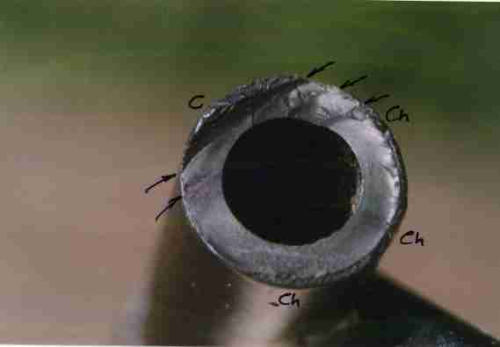
Close-up of broken nylon fuel pipe connector caused by SCC

For example, the fracture surface of a fuel connector showed the progressive growth of the crack from acid attack (Ch) to the final cusp (C) of polymer. In this case the failure was caused by hydrolysis of the polymer by contact with sulfuric acid leaking from a car battery. The degradation reaction is the reverse of the synthesis reaction of the polymer:

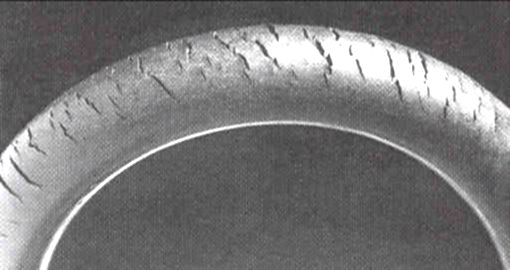
Ozone cracking in natural rubber tubing

Cracks can be formed in many different elastomers by ozone attack, another form of SCC in polymers. Tiny traces of the gas in the air will attack double bonds in rubber chains, with natural rubber, styrene-butadiene rubber, and nitrile butadiene rubber being most sensitive to degradation. Ozone cracks form in products under tension, but the critical strain is very small. The cracks are always oriented at right angles to the strain axis, so will form around the circumference in a rubber tube bent over. Such cracks are dangerous when they occur in fuel pipes because the cracks will grow from the outside exposed surfaces into the bore of the pipe, so fuel leakage and fire may follow. Ozone cracking can be prevented by adding anti-ozonants to the rubber before vulcanization. Ozone cracks were commonly seen in automobile tire sidewalls, but are now seen rarely thanks to the use of these additives. On the other hand, the problem does recur in unprotected products such as rubber tubing and seals.

=== Ceramics ===
This effect is significantly less common in ceramics which are typically more resilient to chemical attack. Although phase changes are common in ceramics under stress these usually result in toughening rather than failure (see Zirconium dioxide). Recent studies have shown that the same driving force for this toughening mechanism can also enhance oxidation of reduced cerium oxide, resulting in slow crack growth and spontaneous failure of dense ceramic bodies.

=== Glass ===
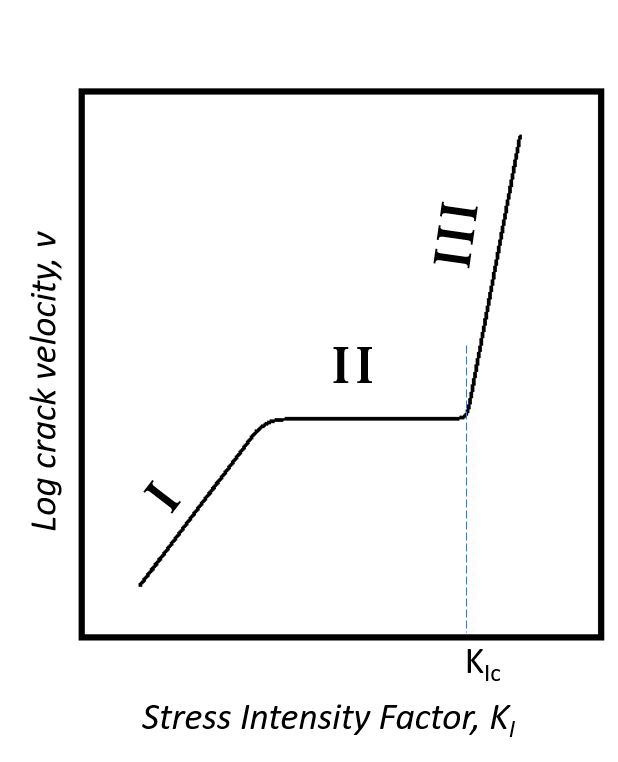
Illustrated are regions of different crack propagation under stress corrosion cracking. In region I, crack propagation is dominated by chemical attack of strained bonds in the crack. In region II, propagation is controlled by diffusion of chemical into the crack. In region III, the stress intensity reaches its critical value and propagates independent of its environment.

Subcritical crack propagation in glasses falls into three regions. In region I, the velocity of crack propagation increases with ambient humidity due to stress-enhanced chemical reaction between the glass and water. In region II, crack propagation velocity is diffusion controlled and dependent on the rate at which chemical reactants can be transported to the tip of the crack. In region III, crack propagation is independent of its environment, having reached a critical stress intensity. Chemicals other than water, like ammonia, can induce subcritical crack propagation in silica glass, but they must have an electron donor site and a proton donor site.

== Prevention ==
- The compressive residual stresses imparted by laser peening are precisely controlled both in location and intensity and can be applied to mitigate sharp transitions into tensile regions. Laser peening imparts deep compressive residual stresses on the order of 10 to 20 times deeper than conventional shot peening, making them significantly more beneficial at preventing SCC. Laser peening is widely used in the aerospace and power generation industries in gas fired turbine engines.
- Material Selection: Choosing the right material for a specific environment can help prevent SCC. Materials with higher resistance to corrosion and stress corrosion cracking should be used in corrosive environments. For example, using stainless steel instead of carbon steel in a marine environment can reduce the likelihood of SCC.
- Protective Coatings: Applying a protective coating or barrier can help prevent corrosive substances from coming into contact with the metal surface, thus reducing the likelihood of SCC. For example, using an epoxy coating on the interior surface of a pipeline can reduce the likelihood of SCC.
- Cathodic Protection: Cathodic protection is a technique used to protect metals from corrosion by applying a small electrical current to the metal surface. This technique can also help prevent SCC by reducing the corrosion potential of the metal.
- Environmental Controls: Controlling the environment around the metal can help prevent SCC. For example, reducing the temperature or acidity of the environment can help prevent SCC.
- Inspection and Maintenance: Regular inspections and maintenance can help detect SCC before it causes a failure. This includes visual inspections, non-destructive testing, and monitoring of environmental factors.

== Notable failures ==
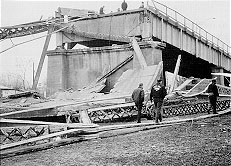
The collapsed Silver Bridge, as seen from the Ohio side

- A 32-inch diameter gas transmission pipeline, north of Natchitoches, Louisiana, belonging to the Tennessee Gas Pipeline exploded and burned from SCC on March 4, 1965, killing 17 people. At least 9 others were injured, and 7 homes 450 feet from the rupture were destroyed.
- SCC caused the catastrophic collapse of the Silver Bridge in December 1967, when an eyebar suspension bridge across the Ohio River at Point Pleasant, West Virginia, suddenly failed. The main chain joint failed and the entire structure fell into the river, killing 46 people who were traveling in vehicles across the bridge. Rust in the eyebar joint had caused a stress corrosion crack, which went critical as a result of high bridge loading and low temperature. The failure was exacerbated by a high level of residual stress in the eyebar. The disaster led to a nationwide reappraisal of bridges.
- Aloha Airlines Flight 243: In 1988, Aloha Airlines Flight 243 experienced a partial fuselage failure due to SCC. The Boeing 737-200 was flying from Hilo to Honolulu, Hawaii when a section of the fuselage ruptured, causing a decompression event. The investigation into the failure found that SCC had occurred in the aluminum skin of the fuselage due to the repeated pressurization and depressurization cycles of the aircraft. The incident led to changes in maintenance procedures and inspections for aircraft to prevent similar failures in the future.
- Trans-Alaska Pipeline: In 2001, a section of the Trans-Alaska Pipeline failed due to SCC. The pipeline is used to transport crude oil from the North Slope of Alaska to the Valdez Marine Terminal. The failure occurred when a 34-foot section of the pipeline ruptured, causing a spill of over 285,000 gallons of crude oil. The investigation into the failure found that SCC had occurred in the pipeline due to the presence of water and bacteria, which had created a corrosive environment.
- USS Hartford submarine periscope: In 2009, the periscope of the submarine USS Hartford failed due to SCC. The periscope is used to provide a view of the surface while the submarine is submerged. The failure occurred when the periscope was extended through the hull of the submarine, causing seawater to enter the periscope's seal. The seawater caused SCC to occur in the periscope's steel support structure, which led to the periscope falling back into the submarine. Fortunately, there were no injuries, but the submarine had to be taken out of service for repairs.
- NDK Crystal: In 2009, a 50-foot-tall quartz-growing autoclave in a plant in Belvidere, Illinois violently ruptured due to SCC, causing one fatality and one injury in nearby businesses. The autoclave was filled with hot, highly pressurized sodium hydroxide solution, and the thick steel pressure vessel was not rated to withstand corrosive environments. However, the plant's operators incorrectly believed that the vessel walls would be protected from corrosion by the formation of a self-passivating layer of iron sodium silicate. Despite a previous SCC incident in 2007 and specific warnings from NDK Crystal's insurance provider, none of the plant's eight autoclaves were ever given safety inspections.

== See also ==
- Forensic chemistry – Forensic application of the study of chemistry
- Forensic engineering – Investigation of failures associated with legal intervention
- Forensic materials engineering – Branch of forensic engineering
- Forensic polymer engineering – Study of failure in polymeric products
- Fracture mechanics – Study of propagation of cracks in materials
- Environmental stress cracking – Brittle failure of thermoplastic polymers
- Environmental stress fracture – Material failure
- Hydrogen embrittlement – Reduction in ductility of a metal exposed to hydrogen
- Ozone cracking – Cracks in many different elastomers due to ozone attack
- Polymer degradation – Alteration in the polymer properties under the influence of environmental factors
- Season cracking – Form of stress-corrosion cracking of brass cartridge cases
- Sulfide stress cracking – Form of hydrogen embrittlement due to hydrogen sulfide
