= Longitudinal axis =

Longitudinal axis may refer to:

- In anatomy, going from head to tail; see Anatomical terms of location § Axes
- In aviation, nose to tail of a plane; see Aircraft principal axes § Longitudinal axis (roll)
- In geography, an imaginary line passing through the centroid of the cross sections along the long axis of an object
