= Environmental stress cracking =

Brittle failure of thermoplastic polymers

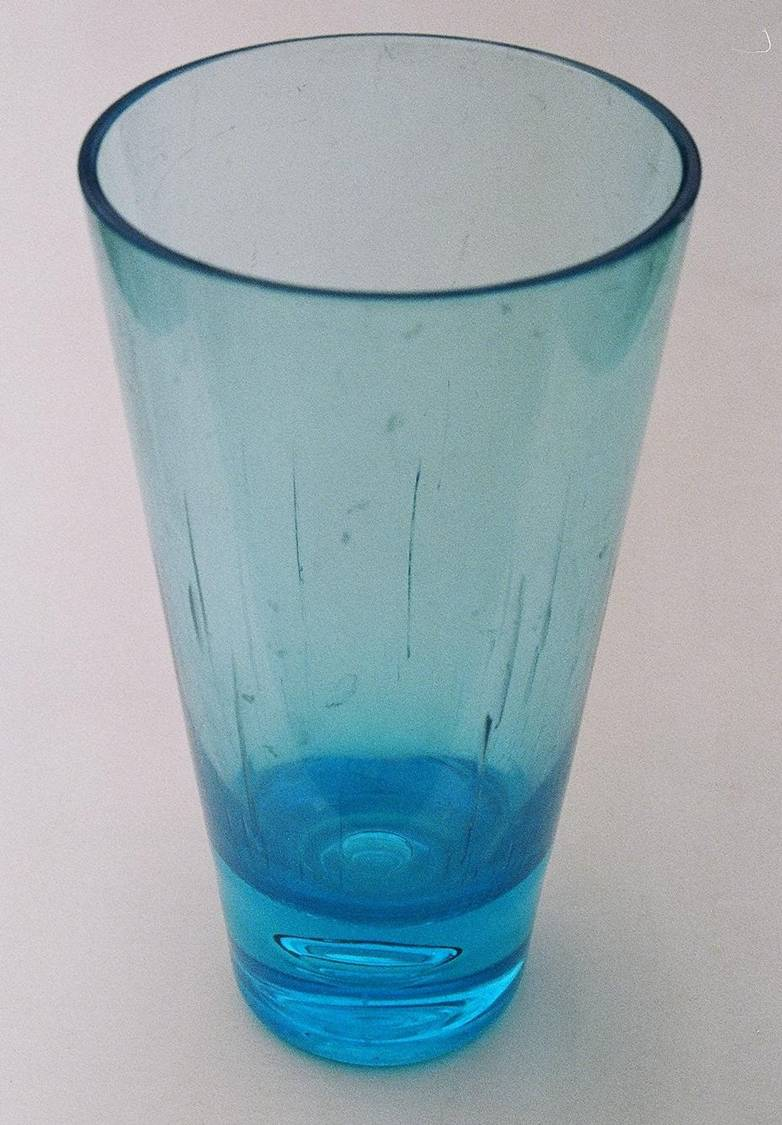
Crazes (surface cracks) produced by ESC in PMMA drinking beaker

Environmental Stress Cracking (ESC) is one of the most common causes of unexpected brittle failure of thermoplastic (especially amorphous) polymers known at present. According to ASTM D883, stress cracking is defined as "an external or internal crack in a plastic caused by tensile stresses less than its short-term mechanical strength". This type of cracking typically involves brittle cracking, with little or no ductile drawing of the material from its adjacent failure surfaces. Environmental stress cracking may account for around 15-30% of all plastic component failures in service. This behavior is especially prevalent in glassy, amorphous thermoplastics. Amorphous polymers exhibit ESC because of their loose structure which makes it easier for the fluid to permeate into the polymer. Amorphous polymers are more prone to ESC at temperature higher than their glass transition temperature (T_{g}) due to the increased free volume. When T_{g} is approached, more fluid can permeate into the polymer chains.

== Exposure of polymers to solvents ==
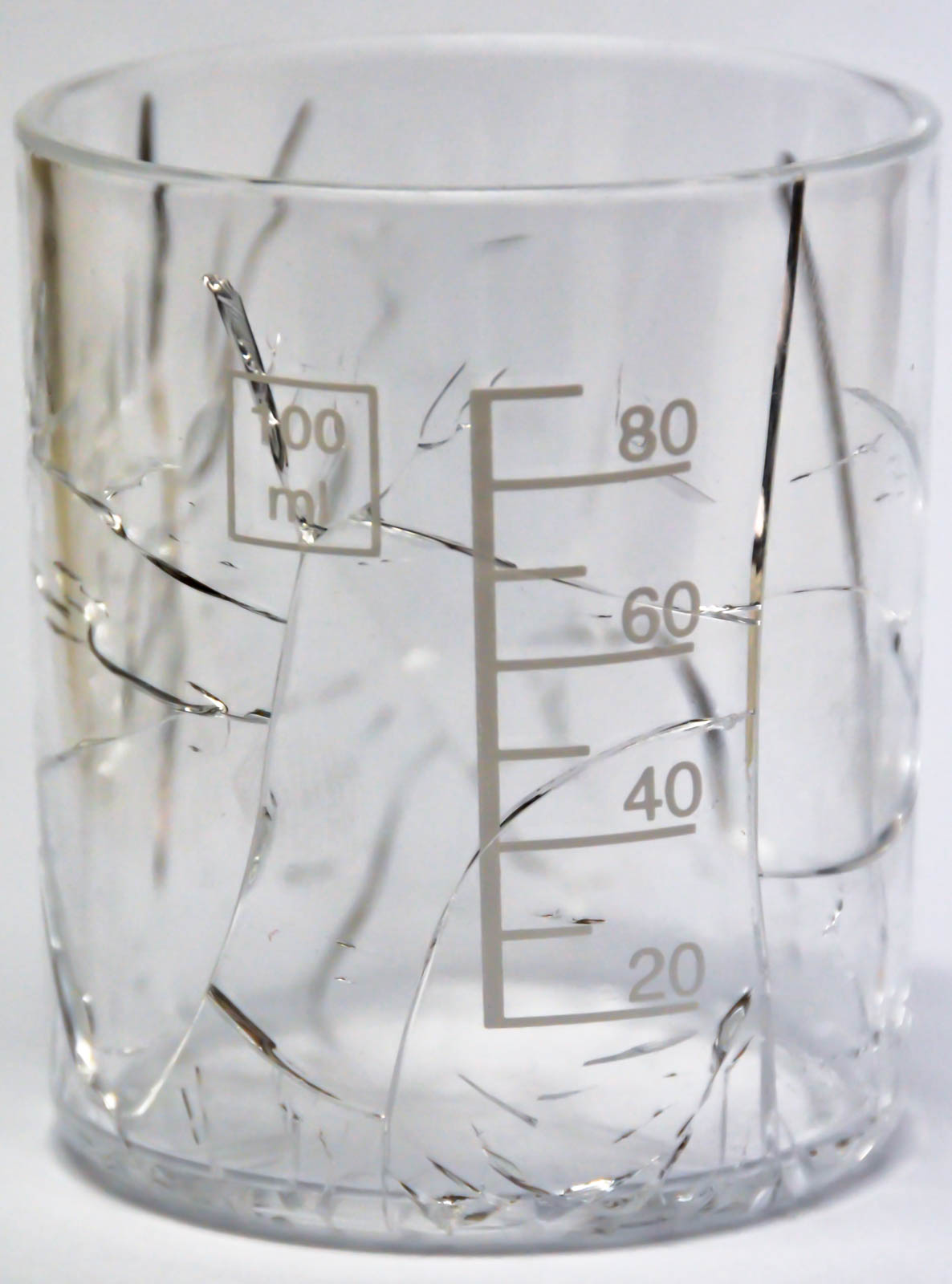
Poly(methyl methacrylate) (PMMA, plexiglas) beaker cracked after exposure to ethanol

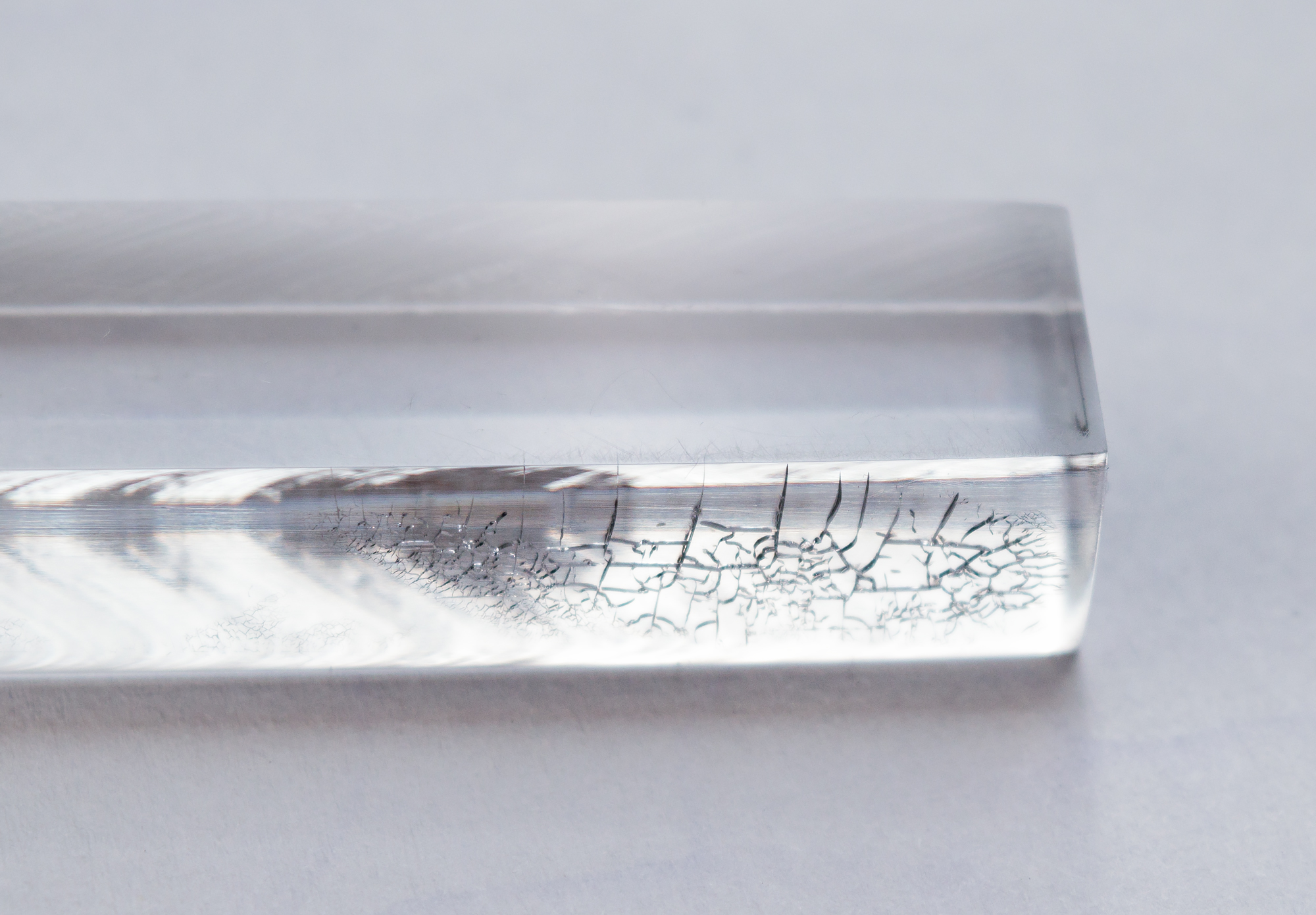
Environmental stress cracking affecting a piece of poly(methyl methacrylate) (PMMA, plexiglas)

ESC and polymer resistance to ESC (ESCR) have been studied for several decades. Research shows that the exposure of polymers to liquid chemicals tends to accelerate the crazing process, initiating crazes at stresses that are much lower than the stress causing crazing in air. The action of either a tensile stress or a corrosive liquid alone would not be enough to cause failure, but in ESC the initiation and growth of a crack is caused by the combined action of the stress and a corrosive environmental liquid. These corrosive environmental liquids are called 'secondary chemical agents', are often organic, and are defined as solvents not anticipated to come into contact with the plastic during its lifetime of use. Failure is rarely associated with primary chemical agents, as these materials are anticipated to come into contact with the polymer during its lifetime, and thus compatibility is ensured prior to use. In air, failure due to creep is known as creep rupture, as the air acts as a plasticizer, and this acts in parallel to environmental stress cracking.

It is somewhat different from polymer degradation in that stress cracking does not break polymer bonds. Instead, it breaks the secondary linkages between polymers. These are broken when the mechanical stresses cause minute cracks in the polymer and they propagate rapidly under the harsh environmental conditions. It has also been seen that catastrophic failure under stress can occur due to the attack of a reagent that would not attack the polymer in an unstressed state. Environmental stress cracking is accelerated due to higher temperatures, cyclic loading, increased stress concentrations, and fatigue.

Metallurgists typically use the term Stress corrosion cracking or Environmental stress fracture to describe this type of failure in metals.

== Factors influencing ESC ==
Although the phenomenon of ESC has been known for a number of decades, research has not yet enabled prediction of this type of failure for all environments and for every type of polymer. Some scenarios are well known, documented or are able to be predicted, but there is no complete reference for all combinations of stress, polymer and environment. The rate of ESC is dependent on many factors including the polymer's chemical makeup, bonding, crystallinity, surface roughness, molecular weight and residual stress. It also depends on the liquid reagent's chemical nature and concentration, the temperature of the system and the strain rate.

== Mechanisms of ESC ==
There are a number of opinions on how certain reagents act on polymers under stress. Because ESC is often seen in amorphous polymers rather than in semicrystalline polymers, theories regarding the mechanism of ESC often revolve around liquid interactions with the amorphous regions of polymers. One such theory is that the liquid can diffuse into the polymer, causing swelling which increases the polymer's chain mobility. The result is a decrease in the yield stress and glass transition temperature (T_{g}), as well as a plasticisation of the material which leads to crazing at lower stresses and strains. A second view is that the liquid can reduce the energy required to create new surfaces in the polymer by wetting the polymer's surface and hence aid the formation of voids, which is thought to be very important in the early stages of craze formation. ESC may occur continuously, or a piece-wise start and stop mechanism

There is an array of experimentally derived evidence to support the above theories:

- Once a craze is formed in a polymer this creates an easy diffusion path so that the environmental attack can continue and the crazing process can accelerate.
- Chemical compatibility between the environment and the polymer govern the amount in which the environment can swell and plasticise the polymer.
- The effects of ESC are reduced when crack growth rate is high. This is primarily due to the inability of the liquid to keep up with the growth of the crack.
- Once separated from the other chains, the polymers align, thus allowing embrittlement.

ESC generally occurs at the surface of a plastic and doesn't require the secondary chemical agent to penetrate the material significantly, which leaves the bulk properties unmodified.

Another theory for the mechanism of craze propagation in amorphous polymers is proposed by Kramer. According to his theory, the formation of internal surfaces in polymers is facilitated by polymeric surface tension that is determined by both secondary interactions and the contribution of load-bearing chains that must undergo fracture or slippage to form a surface. This theory provides an explanation for the decrease in the stress needed to propagate the craze in the presence of surface-active reagents such as detergents and high temperature.

=== ESC mechanism in polyethylene ===
Semi-crystalline polymers such as polyethylene show brittle fracture under stress if exposed to stress cracking agents. In such polymers, the crystallites are connected by the tie molecules through the amorphous phase. The tie molecules play an important role in the mechanical properties of the polymer through the transferring of load. Stress cracking agents, such as detergents, act to lower the cohesive forces which maintain the tie molecules in the crystallites, thus facilitating their "pull-out" and disentanglement from the lamellae. As a result, cracking is initiated at stress values lower than the critical stress level of the material.

In general, the mechanism of environmental stress cracking in polyethylene involves the disentanglement of the tie molecules from the crystals. The number of tie molecules and the strength of the crystals that anchor them are considered the controlling factors in determining the polymer resistance to ESC.

== Characterizing ESC ==
A number of different methods are used to evaluate a polymer's resistance to environmental stress cracking. A common method in the polymer industry is use of the Bergen jig, which subjects the sample to variable strain during a single test. The results of this test indicate the critical strain to cracking, using only one sample. Another widely used test is the Bell Telephone test where bent strips are exposed to fluids of interest under controlled conditions. Further, new tests have been developed where the time for crack initiation under transverse loading and an aggressive solvent (10% Igepal CO-630 solution) is evaluated. These methods rely on an indentor to stress the material biaxially, while preventing a radial stress concentration. The stressed polymer sits in the aggressive agent and the stressed plastic around the indentor is watched to evaluate the time to crack formation, which is the way that ESC resistance is quantified. A testing apparatus for this method is known as the Telecom and is commercially available; initial experiments have shown that this testing gives equivalent results to ASTM D1693, but at a much shorter time scale. Current research deals with the application of fracture mechanics to the study of ESC phenomena. In summary, though, there is not a singular descriptor that is applicable to ESC—rather, the specific fracture is dependent on the material, conditions, and secondary chemical agents present .

Scanning electron microscopy and fractographic methods have historically been used to analyze the failure mechanism, particularly in high density polyethylene (HDPE). Freeze fracture has proved particularly useful for examining the kinetics of ESC, as they provide a snapshot in time of the crack propagation process.

== Strain hardening as a measure of environmental stress cracking resistance (ESCR) ==
Many different methods exist for measuring ESCR. However, the long testing time and high costs associated with these methods slow down the R&D activities for designing materials with higher resistance to stress cracking. To overcome these challenges, a new simpler and faster method was developed by SABIC to assess ESCR for high density polyethylene (HDPE) materials. In this method, the resistance of slow crack growth or environmental stress cracking is predicted from simple tensile measurement at a temperature of 80 °C. When polyethylene is deformed under a uniaxial tension, before yield, the stiff crystalline phase of the polymer undergoes small deformation while the amorphous domains deforms significantly. After the yield point but before the material undergoes strain hardening, the crystalline lamellae slips where both the crystalline phase and the amorphous domains contribute to load bearing and straining. At some point, the amorphous domains will stretch fully at which the strain hardening begin. In the strain hardening region, the elongated amorphous domains become the loading bearing phase whereas the crystalline lamellae undergoes fracture and unfold to adjust for the change in strain. The load-bearing chains in the amorphous domains in polyethylene are made of tie-molecules and entangles chains. Because of the key role of tie-molecules and entanglements in resisting environmental stress cracking in polyethylene, it follows that ESCR and strain hardening behaviors can very well be correlated.

In the strain hardening method, the slope of strain hardening region (above the natural draw ratio) in the true stress-strain curves is calculated and used as a measure of ESCR. This slope is called the strain hardening modulus (G_{p}). The strain hardening modulus is calculated over the entire strain hardening region in the true stress strain curve. The strain hardening region of the stress-strain curve is considered to be the homogeneously deforming part well above the natural draw ratio, which is determined by presence of the neck propagation, and below the maximum elongation. The strain hardening modulus when measured at 80 °C is sensitive to the same molecular factors that govern slow crack resistance in HDPE as measured by an accelerated ESCR test where a surface active agent is used. The strain hardening modulus and ESCR values for polyethylene have been found to be strongly correlated with each others.

== Examples ==
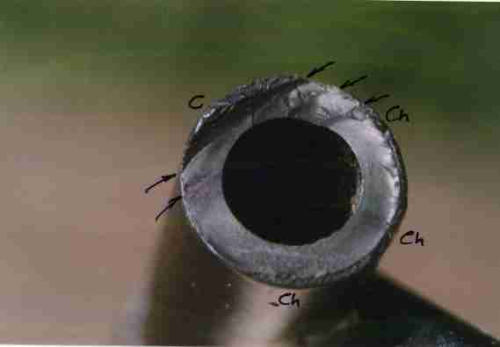
Nylon fuel pipe damaged by environmental stress cracking after a small leak of battery acid

An obvious example of the need to resist ESC in everyday life is the automotive industry, in which a number of different polymers are subjected to a number of fluids. Some of the chemicals involved in these interactions include petrol, brake fluid and windscreen cleaning solution. Plasticisers leaching from PVC can also cause ESC over an extended period of time, for example. One of the first examples of the problem concerned ESC of LDPE. The material was initially used in insulating electric cables, and cracking occurred due to the interaction of the insulation with oils. The solution to the problem lay in increasing the molecular weight of the polymer. A test of exposure to a strong detergent such as Igepal was developed to give a warning of ESC.

=== Styrene acrylonitrile susceptibility to ketone solvent ===
A more specific example comes in the form of a piano key made from injection moulded styrene acrylonitrile (SAN). The key has a hook end which connects it to a metal spring, which causes the key to spring back into position after being struck. During assembly of the piano an adhesive was used, and excess adhesive which had spilled onto areas where it was not required was removed using a ketone solvent. Some vapour from this solvent condensed on the internal surface of the piano keys. Some time after this cleaning, fracture occurred at the junction where the hook end meets the spring.

To determine the cause of the fracture, the SAN piano key was heated above its glass transition temperature for a short time. If there is residual stress within the polymer, the piece will shrink when held at such a temperature. Results showed that there was significant shrinkage, particularly at the hook end-spring junction. This indicates stress concentration, possibly the combination of residual stress from forming and the action of the spring. It was concluded that although there was residual stress, the fracture was due to a combination of the tensile stress from the spring action and the presence of the ketone solvent.

=== Polymer formworks susceptibility to concrete paste ===
Polymer formworks can suffer from sudden failures during casting, which are generally associated with the pressure exerted by the wet concrete on thin plastic formworks. Such failures can be substantially accelerated by the corrosive effects of the wet concrete paste, which has a pH of circa 13. Certain thermoplastics are more severely affected, especially those in amorphous form, such as PLA, PET and PC. This phenomenon is even more pronounced in 3D-printed polymer formworks, where there is a correlation between the environmental stress cracking mechanism and layer interface grooves, where stresses concentrate.

== See also ==
- Crazing
- Corrosion engineering
- Creep (deformation)
- Crocodile cracking
- Embrittlement
- Environmental stress fracture
- Forensic engineering
- Forensic polymer engineering
- Fracture Mechanics
- Season cracking
- Stress corrosion cracking
- Structural failure
