= Johny Kirsch =

Luxembourgish footballer

Personal information
- Date of birth: 26 November 1944 (age 81)

International career
Years	Team	Apps	(Gls)
1964–1973	Luxembourg	8	(0)

Johny Kirsch (born 26 November 1944) is a Luxembourgish footballer. He played in eight matches for the Luxembourg national football team from 1964 to 1973.
