= Microvoid coalescence =

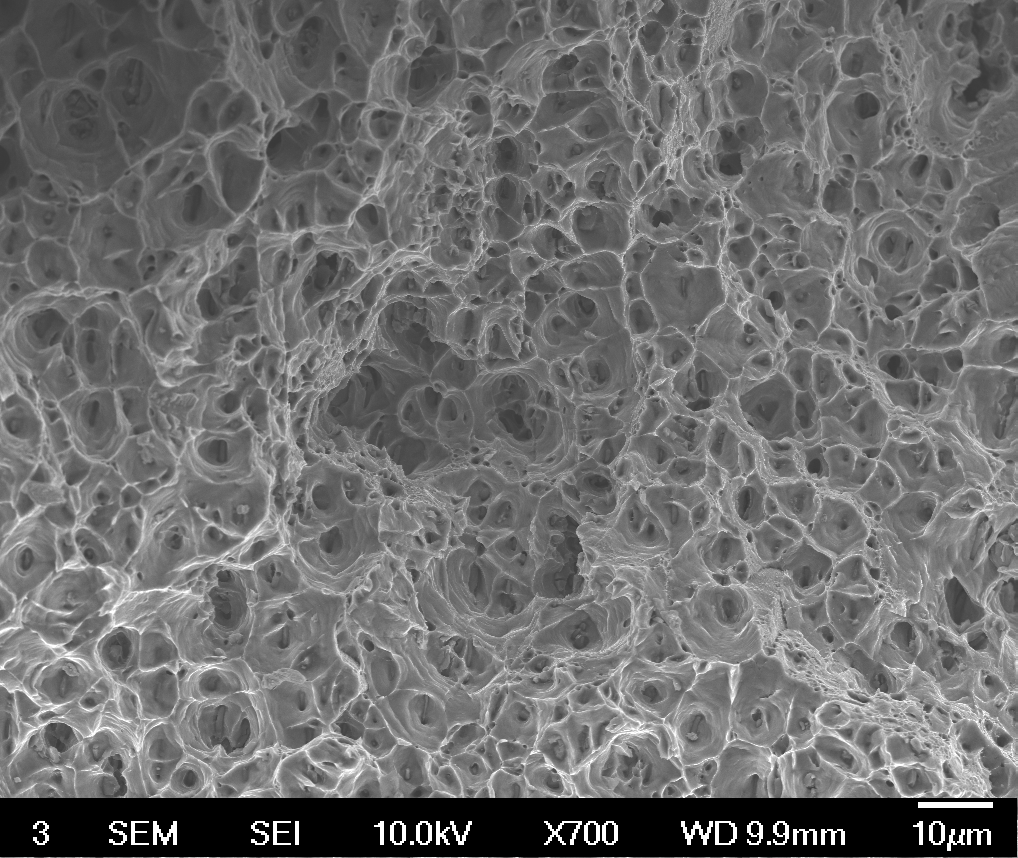
SEM image of microvoid coalescence seen on a ductile fracture surface of 6061-T6 Al

Microvoid coalescence (MVC) is a high energy microscopic fracture mechanism observed in the majority of metallic alloys and in some engineering plastics.

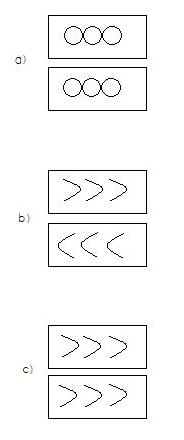
MVC fracture surface morphologies for a) tension, b) shear, and c) bending failures

== Fracture process ==
MVC proceeds in three stages: nucleation, growth, and coalescence of microvoids. The nucleation of microvoids can be caused by particle cracking or interfacial failure between precipitate particles and the matrix. Additionally, microvoids often form at grain boundaries or inclusions within the material. Microvoids grow during plastic flow of the matrix, and microvoids coalesce when adjacent microvoids link together or the material between microvoids experiences necking. Microvoid coalescence leads to fracture. Void growth rates can be predicted assuming continuum plasticity using the Rice-Tracey model:

$\ln\left(\frac{\bar{R}}{R_0}\right) = \int\limits_{0}^{\epsilon_q} A\left(\frac{3\sigma_m}{2\sigma_{ys}}\right)d\epsilon_v^p$

where $A$ is a constant typically equal to 0.283 (but dependent upon the stress triaxiality), $\sigma_{ys}$ is the yield stress, $\sigma_m$ is the mean stress, $\epsilon_q$ is the equivalent Von Mises plastic strain, $R_o$ is the particle size, and $\bar{R}$ produced by the stress triaxality:

$\bar{R}=\frac{R_1 + R_2 + R_3}{3}$

== Fracture surface morphologies ==
MVC can result in three distinct fracture morphologies based on the type of loading at failure. Tensile loading results in equiaxed dimples, which are spherical depressions a few micrometres in diameter that coalesce normal to the loading axis. Shear stresses will result elongated dimples, which are parabolic depressions that coalesce in planes of maximum shear stress. The depressions point back to the crack origin, and shear influenced failure will produce depressions that point in opposite directions on opposing fracture surfaces. Combined tension and bending will also produce the elongated dimple morphology, but the directions of the depressions will be in the same direction on both fracture surfaces.
