= David Kirsch =

American oncologist

David Guy Kirsch is an American oncologist currently the Barbara Levine University Professor at Duke University and an Elected Fellow of the American Association for the Advancement of Science.

== Education ==
He earned his M.D. and Ph.D. at Johns Hopkins University School of Medicine in 2000.

== Research ==
His interests are in studying sarcomagenesis, cancer biology and radiation oncology. His highest cited papers are "Conversion of Bcl-2 to a Bax-like death effector by caspases", at 1332 times, and "Restoration of p53 function leads to tumour regression in vivo", at 1320 times, according to Google Scholar.

== Publications ==
- Yoon, SW, Cramer, CK, Miles, DA, Reinsvold, MH, Joo, KM, Kirsch, DG, and Oldham, M. "A precision 3D conformal treatment technique in rats: Application to whole-brain radiotherapy with hippocampal avoidance." Medical physics 44, no. 11 (November 2017): 6008–6017.
- Dodd, RD, Lee, C-L, Overton, T, Huang, W, Eward, WC, Luo, L, Ma, Y, Ingram, DR, Torres, KE, Cardona, DM, Lazar, AJ, and Kirsch, DG. "NF1+/- Hematopoietic Cells Accelerate Malignant Peripheral Nerve Sheath Tumor Development without Altering Chemotherapy Response." Cancer research 77, no. 16 (August 2017): 4486–4497.
- Huang, J, Chen, M, Whitley, MJ, Kuo, H-C, Xu, ES, Walens, A, Mowery, YM, Van Mater, D, Eward, WC, Cardona, DM, Luo, L, Ma, Y, Lopez, OM, Nelson, CE, Robinson-Hamm, JN, Reddy, A, Dave, SS, Gersbach, CA, Dodd, RD, and Kirsch, DG. "Generation and comparison of CRISPR-Cas9 and Cre-mediated genetically engineered mouse models of sarcoma." Nature communications 8 (July 10, 2017): 15999-.
- Castle, KD, Chen, M, Wisdom, AJ, and Kirsch, DG. "Genetically engineered mouse models for studying radiation biology." Translational Cancer Research 6, no. S5 (July 2017): S900-S913.
- McConnell, AM, Yao, C, Yeckes, AR, Wang, Y, Selvaggio, AS, Tang, J, Kirsch, DG, and Stripp, BR. "p53 Regulates Progenitor Cell Quiescence and Differentiation in the Airway." Cell reports 17, no. 9 (November 2016): 2173–2182.
