= Edmund Kirsch =

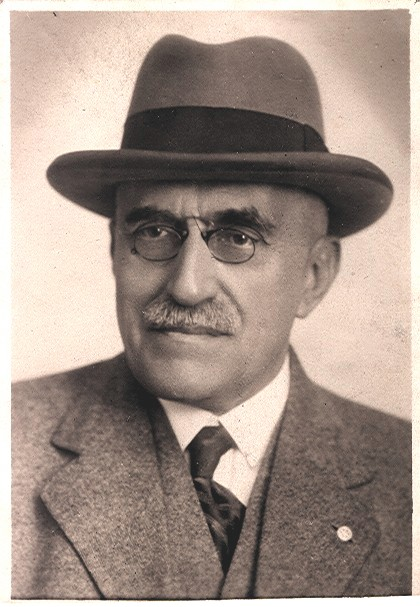
- Edmund Kirsch.jpg
- Born: 16 November 1866; Brno, Austrian Empire
- Died: 18 January 1954 (aged 87); Prague, Czechoslovakia
- Occupation: Businessman

Edmund Kirsch (16 November 1866 – 18 January 1954) was a Czech businessman and translator.

== Life ==
Edmund Kirsch was born in Brno on 16 November 1866. His father was managing director in one textile factory in Moscow. After graduating from textile school in Brno he was invited by his uncle Edmund Pintner to get practice in the textile factory of Vonwiller & Co. in Žamberk.

By the end of the 1870s he had studied at college in Denmark. Besides Czech language and Danish language he spoke German, English, French and Russian. After graduating in Denmark he returned to Žamberk in 1885.

== Popular culture ==
Novelist Dan Brown used a name very similar to his "Edmond Kirsch" for the billionaire, futurist character in his 2017 novel Origin.
