= Ernst Gustav Kirsch =

German engineer

Ernst Gustav Kirsch (September 13, 1841 – January 8, 1901) was a German engineer. Kirsch was educated at Sorbonne, in Zürich and in Berlin. He was a professor from 1874 at the Chemnitz University of Technology in Chemnitz, Germany. Kirsch is primarily known for the Kirsch equations describing the elastic stress state around a hole.
