= Kirsch equations =

Equations describing elastic stresses

The Kirsch equations describe the elastic stresses around a hole in an infinite plate under one directional tension. They are named after Ernst Gustav Kirsch.

== Result ==
Loading an infinite plate with a circular hole of radius a with stress σ, the resulting stress field is (the angle is with respect to the direction of application of the stress):

$\sigma_{rr} = \frac{\sigma}{2}\left(1 - \frac{a^2}{r^2}\right) + \frac{\sigma}{2}\left(1 + 3\frac{a^4}{r^4} - 4\frac{a^2}{r^2}\right)\cos 2\theta$

$\sigma_{\theta\theta} = \frac{\sigma}{2}\left(1 + \frac{a^2}{r^2}\right) - \frac{\sigma}{2}\left(1 + 3\frac{a^4}{r^4}\right)\cos 2\theta$

$\sigma_{r\theta} = - \frac{\sigma}{2}\left(1 - 3\frac{a^4}{r^4} + 2\frac{a^2}{r^2}\right)\sin 2\theta$
