= Season cracking =

Form of stress-corrosion cracking of brass cartridge cases

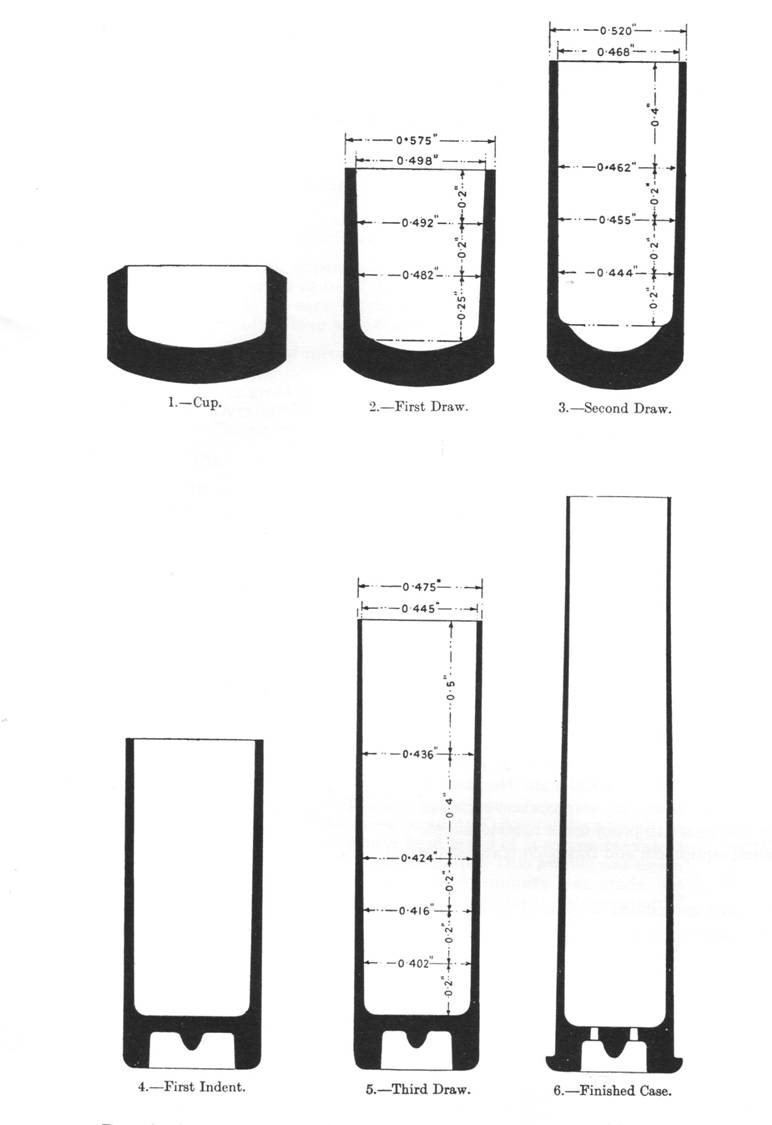
Different draw ratios for brass cartridge case

Season cracking is a form of stress-corrosion cracking of brass cartridge cases originally reported from British forces in India. During the monsoon season, military activity was temporarily reduced, and ammunition was stored in stables until the dry weather returned. Many brass cartridges were subsequently found to be cracked, especially where the case was crimped to the bullet. It was not until 1921 that the phenomenon was explained by Moor, Beckinsale and Mallinson: ammonia from horse urine, combined with the residual stress in the cold-drawn metal of the cartridges, was responsible for the cracking.

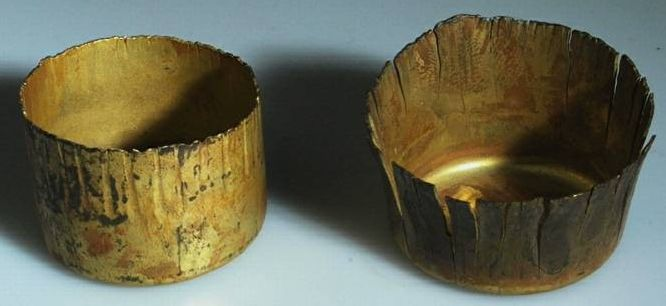
Cracking in brass caused by ammonia attack

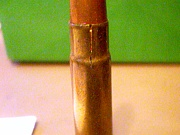
A .35 Remington cartridge that has experienced season cracking

Season cracking is characterised by deep brittle cracks which penetrate into affected components. If the cracks reach a critical size, the component can suddenly fracture, sometimes with disastrous results. However, if the concentration of ammonia is very high, then attack is much more severe, and attack over all exposed surfaces occurs. The problem was solved by annealing the brass cases after forming so as to relieve the residual stresses.

== Ammonia ==
The attack takes the form of a reaction between ammonia and copper to form the cuprammonium ion, formula [Cu(NH_{3})_{4}]^{2+}, a chemical complex which is water-soluble, and hence washed from the growing cracks. The problem of cracking can therefore also occur in copper and any other copper alloy, such as bronze. The tendency of copper to react with ammonia was exploited in making rayon, and the deep blue colour of the aqueous solution of copper(II) oxide in ammonia is known as Schweizer's reagent.

== Materials ==
Although the problem was first found in brass, any alloy containing copper will be susceptible to the problem. It includes copper itself (as used in pipe for example), bronzes and other alloys with a significant copper content. Like all problems with hairline cracks, detection in the early stages of attack is difficult, but the characteristic blue coloration may give a clue to attack. Microscopic inspection will often reveal the cracks, and x-ray analysis using the EDX facility on the scanning electron microscope or SEM should reveal the presence of elemental nitrogen from ammoniacal traces.

== See also ==
- Environmental stress fracture – Material failure
- Forensic engineering – Investigation of failures associated with legal intervention
- Stress corrosion cracking – Growth of cracks in a corrosive environment
