= Fracture of biological materials =

Fracture of biological materials may occur in biological tissues making up the musculoskeletal system, commonly called orthopedic tissues: bone, cartilage, ligaments, and tendons. Bone and cartilage, as load-bearing biological materials, are of interest to both a medical and academic setting for their propensity to fracture. For example, a large health concern is in preventing bone fractures in an aging population, especially since fracture risk increases ten fold with aging. Cartilage damage and fracture can contribute to osteoarthritis, a joint disease that results in joint stiffness and reduced range of motion.

Biological materials, especially orthopedic materials, have specific material properties which allow them to resist damage and fracture for a prolonged period of time. Nevertheless, acute damage or continual wear through a lifetime of use can contribute to breakdown of biological materials. Studying bone and cartilage can motivate the design of resilient synthetic materials that could aid in joint replacements. Similarly, studying polymer fracture and soft material fracture could aid in understanding biological material fracture.

The analysis of fracture in biological materials is complicated by multiple factors such as anisotropy, complex loading conditions, and the biological remodeling response and inflammatory response.

== Bone fracture ==
For the medical perspective, see bone fracture.

Fracture in bone could occur because of an acute injury (monotonic loading) or fatigue (cyclic loading). Generally, bone can withstand physiological loading conditions, but aging and diseases like osteoporosis that compromise the hierarchical structure of bone can contribute to bone breakage. Furthermore, the analysis of bone fracture is complicated by the bone remodeling response, where there is a competition between microcrack accumulation and the remodeling rate. If the remodeling rate is slower than the rate microcracks accumulate, bone fracture can occur.

Furthermore, the orientation and location of the crack matters because bone is anisotropic.

=== Bone characterization ===
The hierarchical structure of bone provides it with toughness, the ability to resist crack initiation, propagation, and fracture, as well as strength, the resistance to inelastic deformation. Early analysis of bone material properties, specifically resistance to crack growth, concentrated on yielding a single value for the critical stress-intensity factor, $K_c$, and the critical strain-energy release rate, $G_c$. While this method yielded important insights into bone behavior, it did not lend insight to crack propagation like the resistance curve.

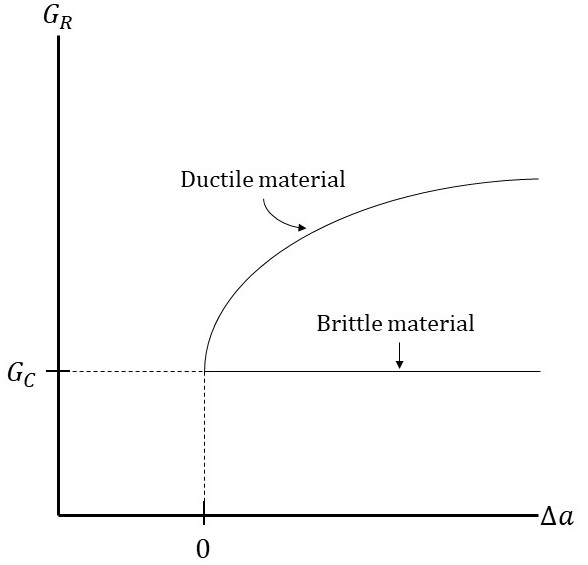
Resistance curve of crack extension force versus crack extension for a brittle and ductile material, showing $G_c$, the critical strain energy release rate.

The resistance curve (R-curve) is utilized to study crack propagation and toughness development of a material by plotting the crack extension force versus crack extension. In bone literature, the R-curve is said to characterize "fracture toughness" behavior, but this term is not favored in engineering literature and the term "crack growth resistance" is used instead. This term is used to emphasize the material behavior over a change in crack length. The R-curve linear elastic fracture mechanics approach allowed researchers to gain insight into two competing mechanisms that contribute to bone toughness. Bone displays a rising R-curve which is indicative of material toughness and stable crack propagation.

There are two types of mechanisms that can impede crack propagation and contribute to toughness, intrinsic and extrinsic mechanisms. Intrinsic mechanisms produce resistance ahead of the crack and extrinsic mechanisms create resistance behind the crack tip in the crack wake. Extrinsic mechanisms are said to contribute to crack-tip shielding which reduces the local stress intensity experienced by the crack. An important difference is that intrinsic mechanisms can impede crack initiation and propagation while extrinsic mechanisms can only inhibit crack propagation.

==== Intrinsic mechanisms ====
Intrinsic toughening mechanisms are not as well defined as extrinsic mechanisms, because they operate on a smaller length-scale than extrinsic mechanisms (usually ~1 μm). Plasticity is usually associated with “soft” materials such as polymers and cartilage, but bone also experiences plastic deformation. One example of an extrinsic mechanism is fibrils (length scale ~10’s nm) sliding against one another, stretching, deforming, and/or breaking. This movement of fibrils causes plastic deformation resulting in crack tip blunting.

==== Extrinsic mechanisms ====
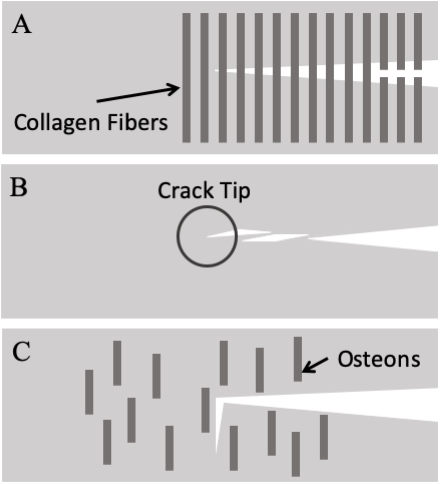
Extrinsic mechanisms contributing to fracture resistance in cortical bone by crack bridging and crack deflection. Adapted from Zimmermann et al. displaying A crack bridging by collagen fibers, B crack bridging by uncracked ligaments, and C crack deflection by osteons.

Extrinsic toughening mechanisms are more well elucidated than intrinsic mechanisms. While the length-scale of intrinsic mechanisms are in the nanometers, the length scale of extrinsic mechanisms are along the micron/micrometer scale. Scanning electron microscopy (SEM) images of bone have allowed imaging of extrinsic mechanisms such as crack bridging (by collagen fibers, or by un-cracked "ligaments"), crack deflection, and micro-cracking. Crack bridging by un-cracked ligaments and crack deflection are the major contributors to crack-shielding while crack bridging by collagen fibers and micro-cracking are minor contributors to crack-shielding.

===== Crack bridging =====
The extrinsic mechanism of crack bridging is when material spans in the crack wake behind the crack reducing the stress intensity factor. The stress intensity experienced at the crack tip, $K_{tip}$, is decreased by the stress intensity of bridging, $K_{br}$.

$K_{tip} = K_{app} - K_{br}$

where $K_{app}$ is the applied stress intensity factor.

Crack bridging can occur by two mechanisms of different length scales.

- Crack Bridging by Collagen Fibers

Crack bridging by Type I collagen fibers otherwise known as collagen-fibril bridging is on a smaller length-scale than untracked ligament bridging. The structure of collagen is in itself hierarchical, consisting of three alpha-chains wrapped together to form pro-collagen which undergoes processing and assembles into fibrils and fibers. The diameter of the collagen molecule is approximately 1.5 nanometers, and the collagen fibril is approximately 10X the diameter of the collagen (~10's nm).

The process of crack bridging is analogous to the way polymers yield through crazing. Polymers plastically deform through crazing, where molecular chains bridge the crack reducing the stress intensity at the crack tip. Just as the Dugdale model is used to predict the stress intensity factor during crazing, the uniform-traction Dugdale-zone model can be used to estimate the decrease in the stress-intensity factor due to crack bridging, $K_b^f$.

$K_b^f = 2 \sigma_b f_f \bigg( \sqrt{\frac{2 l_f}{\pi}} \bigg)$

where the normal bridging stress on the fibers is denoted by $\sigma_b$, the effective area-fraction of the collagen fibers is denoted by $f_f$, and the bridging zone length is denoted by $l_f$.

- Uncracked "Ligament" Bridging

Note: Ligament refers to the appearance of the extrinsic mechanism under imaging and not to the orthopedic ligament.

Uncracked ligament bridging is one of the larger contributors to crack-shielding because the "ligaments" are on the length-scale of hundreds of micrometers in contrast to tens of nanometers. The formation of these ligaments are attributed to non-uniform advancement of the crack front or several microcracks semi-linked together forming bridges of uncracked material.

===== Crack deflection =====
Crack deflection and twist occurs due to osteons, the structural unit of cortical bone. Osteons have a cylindrical structure and are approximately 0.2 mm in diameter. As the crack tip reaches an osteon, crack propagation is deflected along the lateral surface of the osteon slowing crack growth. Because osteons are larger scale, than both collagen fibers and uncracked "ligaments, crack deflection through osteons are one of the major toughening mechanisms of bone.

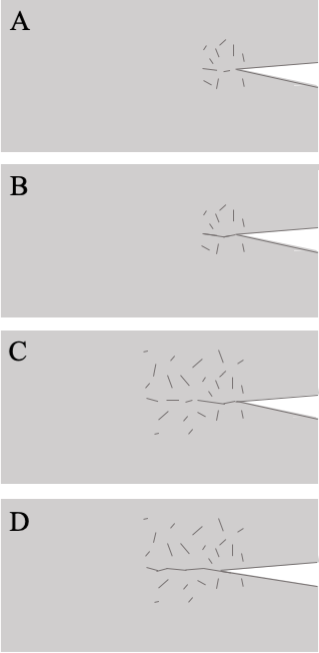
Schematic of crack propagation in cortical bone when microcracking occurs. Adapted from Vashishth et al. A Formation of microcracks ahead of the crack tip B Crack accelerates into uncracked material ahead of microcrack zone (Stage I) C Crack growth slows as microcracks continue forming (Stage II) D Continuation of crack growth (Stage I)

===== Micro-cracking =====
As the name suggests, microcracking is the formation of cracks on the micron scale of various orientations and sizes. The formation of microcracks before and in the wake of the crack tip can delay crack propagation. Since bone often remodels both its trabecular and cortical structure to optimize strength in the longitudinal direction, the formation of microcracks in human bone are also formed longitudinally. This directionally in human bone contrasts with the more random orientation in bovine bone and lends to longitudinal bone toughness in humans.

As with the other mechanisms of crack-shielding, the resistance curve (R-curve) can be used to study the resistance of cortical bone (trabecular bone is removed before experiments) to fracture. A generally accepted model for crack propagation under microcrack formation was proposed by Vashishth and colleagues. They studied the crack propagation velocity as the crack grew and identified two stages of crack growth that alternate as the crack progresses

- Stage I: As the sample is loaded, the frontal process zone forms which is a zone of micro cracks ahead of the main crack tip. The crack accelerates through this zone until the crack tip is ahead of the formed microcracks. Crack propagation slows when the crack tip is ahead of the microcrack zone, where the region of microcracks exert a compressive stress on the crack tip.
- Stage II: Microcracks continue forming around and ahead of the crack tip while the crack slowly progresses. When enough microcracks form, the crack goes back to Stage I.

== Cartilage fracture ==
Studying cartilage damage and fracture from a mechanical perspective can lend insight to medical professionals on treatment of diseases affecting cartilage. Cartilage is a highly complex material with depth-variation of biological properties leading to differences in mechanical properties. Furthermore, cartilage has high water content and collagen content contributing to poroelastic and viscoelastic effects respectively.

Experimentally, impact tests of cartilage samples can be done to simulate physiological high-intensity impact. Common type of experiments include, drop tower tests, pendulum tests, and spring-loaded systems. These impact tests serve to simplify the way the material is analyzed from poroelastic to elastic, because under high-velocity short-duration impacts, fluid does not have time to flow out of the cartilage sample.

== See also ==
- Fracture of soft materials
- Fracture in polymers
- Crack growth resistance curve
- Bone
- Cartilage
