= Crazing =

Yielding mechanism in polymers

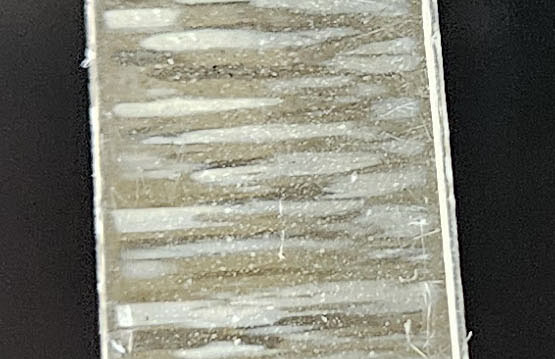
Crazes in polystyrene (PS)

Crazing is a yielding mechanism in polymers characterized by the formation of a fine network of microvoids and fibrils. These structures (known as crazes) typically appear as linear features and frequently precede brittle fracture. The fundamental difference between crazes and cracks is that crazes contain polymer fibrils (5-30 nm in diameter), constituting about 50% of their volume, whereas cracks do not. Unlike cracks, crazes can transmit load between their two faces through these fibrils.

Crazes typically initiate when applied tensile stress causes microvoids to nucleate at points of high stress concentration within the polymer, such as those created by scratches, flaws, cracks, dust particles, and molecular heterogeneities. Crazes grow normal to the principal (tensile) stress, they may extend up to centimeters in length and fractions of a millimeter in thickness if conditions prevent early failure and crack propagation. The refractive index of crazes is lower than that of the surrounding material, causing them to scatter light. Consequently, a stressed material with a high density of crazes may appear 'stress-whitened,' as the scattering makes a normally clear material become opaque.

Crazing is a phenomenon typical of glassy amorphous polymers, but can also be observed in semicrystalline polymers. In thermosetting polymers crazing is less frequently observed because of the inability of the crosslinked molecules to undergo significant molecular stretching and disentanglement, if crazing does occur, it is often due to the interaction with second-phase particles incorporated as a toughening mechanism.

Crazing and fracture during a tensile test on a transparent polymer (x0.25 speed)

== Historical background ==
Crazing, derived from the Middle English term "crasen" meaning "to break", has historically been used to describe a network of fine cracks on the surfaces of glasses and ceramics. This term was naturally extended to describe similar phenomena observed in transparent glassy polymers. Under tensile stress, these polymers develop what appear to be cracks on their surfaces, often very gradually or after prolonged periods. These fine cracks, or crazes, were noted for their ability to propagate across specimens without causing immediate failure.

Crazing in polymers was first identified as a distinct deformation mechanism in the mid-20th century. Unlike inorganic glasses, most glassy polymers were found to be able to undergo significant plastic deformation before fracture occurs. Early observations noted the presence of crazes that propagated across specimens without causing immediate failure, indicating their load-bearing capacity and providing further insights into the nature of crazes, describing their appearance and behaviour under stress.

Significant advancements in the understanding of crazing were made in the 1960s and 1970s, illustrating the formation and structure of crazes in various polymers and on the stress conditions necessary for craze formation in polymers. Researchers demonstrated that crazes grow perpendicular to the principal stress and highlighted the critical stress levels required for their initiation.

== Mechanisms of crazing ==
=== Craze nucleation and growth ===
There is typically a delay between the application of stress and the visible appearance of crazes, indicating a barrier to craze nucleation. The time delay between the application of stress and the nucleation of crazes can be attributed to the viscoelastic nature of the process. Like other viscoelastic phenomena, this delay results from the thermally activated movements of polymer segments under mechanical stress. Crazing involves a localized or inhomogeneous plastic strain of the material. However, while plastic deformation essentially occurs at constant volume, crazing is a cavitation process that takes place with an increase in volume. The initiation of crazing typically requires a dilative component in the stress tensor and can be inhibited by applying hydrostatic pressure. From a solid mechanics perspective this means that a necessary condition for craze nucleation is having a positive value of $I_1$, the first stress invariant that represent the dilatational component:

$I_1 = \sigma_1 + \sigma_2 + \sigma_3>0$

This condition is favored by the presence of triaxial tensile stresses, a condition that exist in defects of bulky samples subjected to plane strain. The cavitation involved in crazing allows the material to achieve plastic strain faster. The presence of cracks or defects in bulky samples will favor the initiation of crazing, as these defects are points of high concentration of stresses and can cause the formation of initial microvoids.

Crazes grow on the plane of maximum principal stress. Craze fibrils can endure substantial tensile forces across the craze but cannot withstand shear forces. Consequently, the highest plastic resistance is achieved by maximizing the normal stress on the plane of the craze. The concept of Taylor's meniscus instability provides a fundamental explanation for the growth of crazes.

Diagram illustrating the mechanism of craze tip advancement through meniscus instability. a) wedge of deformed polymer situated ahead of the void fingers and trailing fibrils. b) to d) sections through the craze, showing the sequence of events as the craze tip progresses by one fibril spacing.

This phenomenon is commonly observed when two flat plates with a layer of liquid between them are forced apart or when adhesive tape is peeled off from a substrate. The hypothesis concerning craze formation states that a wedge-shaped zone of plastically deformed and strain-softened polymer forms ahead of the craze tip. This deformed polymer constitutes the "fluid" layer into which the craze tip "meniscus" propagates, while the undeformed polymer outside the zone acts as the rigid "plates" constraining the fluid. As the finger-like structure of the craze tip advances, fibrils form by the deformation of the polymer webs between the fingers, and the interconnected void network emerges naturally right at the craze tip. Stereo-transmission electron microscopy has demonstrated that meniscus instability is the operative craze tip advancement mechanism in various glassy polymers.

The meniscus formation is a result of the imbalance of surface tension forces, surface tension acts to minimize the surface area, and any disturbance can create a meniscus, a curved surface at the interface between two phases. This causes the polymer chains to pull apart and form a cavity filled with a fibrillar network. This type of instability is well documented in various classes of materials and the concepts were developed from experiments involving the interpenetration of two fluids with different densities. In this scenario, the voided structure of the craze acts like a low-density fluid spreading into the denser, undeformed polymer. The physical principle behind this instability is the difference in hydrostatic pressure across a curved surface. Any disturbance that introduces curvature can propagate if the pressure difference due to the curvature is significant enough to overcome the surface tension. This condition can be written as:

$\delta\sigma_h>\frac{\Gamma}{R}$

where $\Gamma$ is the surface energy and $R$ is the radius of curvature. In theory, any disturbance meeting the criteria of the previous equation can grow, but in reality, a predominant wavelength emerges, which grows the quickest.

=== Craze breakdown and fracture ===
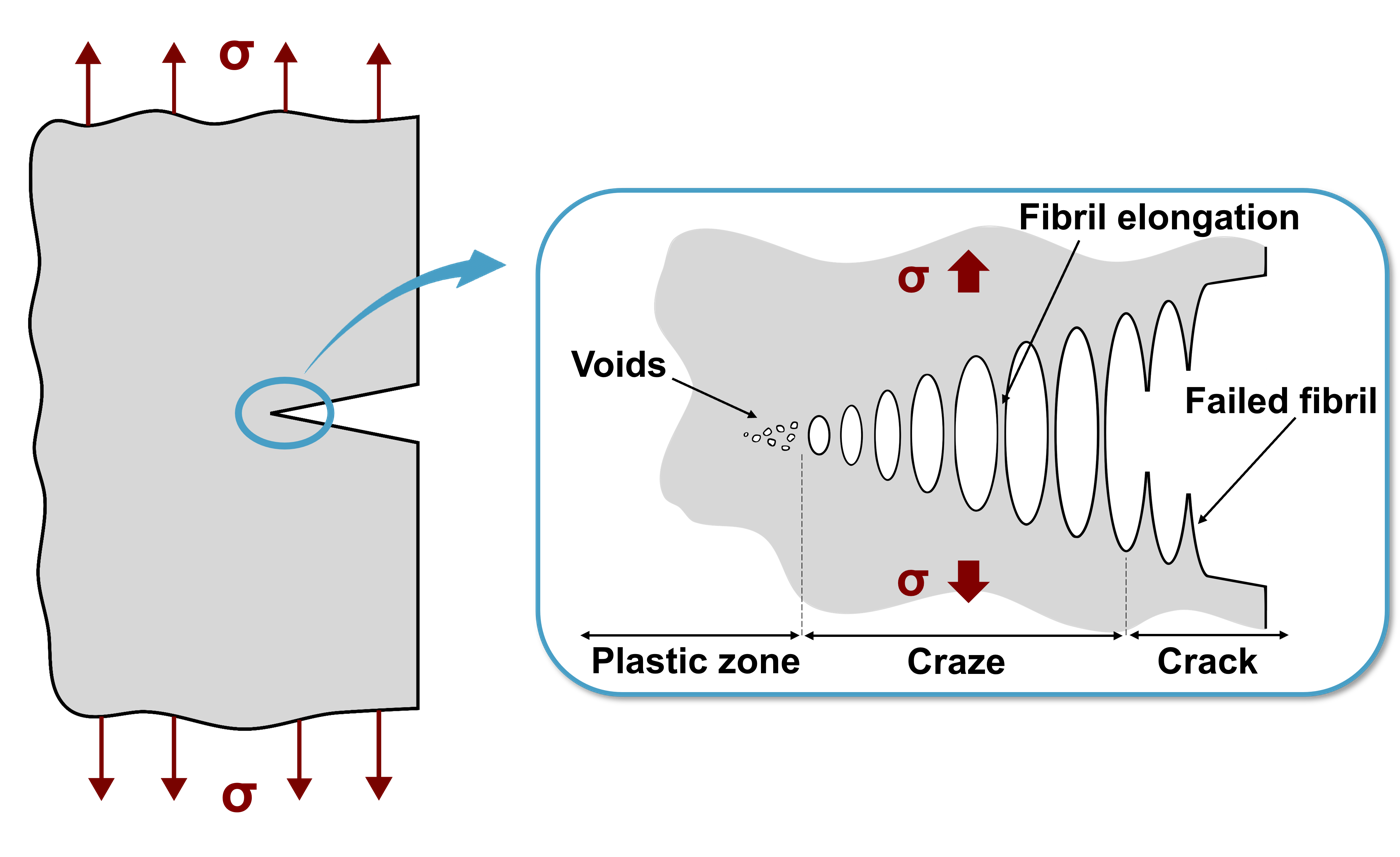
The image shows craze formation, growth and breakdown in a polymer under tensile stress. The left section depicts a polymer sample under stress, while the right section provides a detailed view of craze development at the crack tip.

Crazes in polymers are typically load-bearing and expand in width and area until a region within the craze breaks down, forming a large void. With further stress or over time, this void can develop into a subcritical crack, growing slowly until it reaches a critical length, causing the sample to fracture. For polymers of practical molecular weight, craze growth is necessary but not sufficient for fracture. The critical step in the fracture of most glassy polymer crazes is the initiation of the first large void, defined as several fibril spacing in diameter. This process, known as craze fibril breakdown, is closely linked to the active zone and craze growth at the craze interface. The breakdown of the craze starts gradually as voids coalesce to produce a cavity equal in thickness to the craze itself. Craze breakdown, which leads to crack extension, is crucial to the failure process. However, the detailed mechanisms involved remain a subject of debate among experts, despite the many models that have been suggested.

In the framework of fracture mechanics, once a crack of size $a$ is initiated due to an applied stress $\sigma_\infin$, its propagation can be analyzed using the stress intensity factor $K$:

$K=\sigma_\infin \sqrt{\pi a}$

which describes the stress state near the tip of a crack. According to linear elastic fracture mechanics (LEFM), the crack will propagate when the stress intensity factor reaches a critical value $K_c$, known as the fracture toughness of the material. This approach allows for the prediction of crack growth and the evaluation of the material's resistance to fracture under various loading conditions. It has been observed that for a crack growing relatively slowly in a stable manner and preceded by a craze, then the relationship between $K$ and crack propagation speed $\dot{a}$ can be described by an equation of the form:

$K \propto \dot{a}^n$

Where $n$ is related to the viscoelastic processes at the crack tip that stabilize crack growth.

== Craze yielding and shear yielding ==
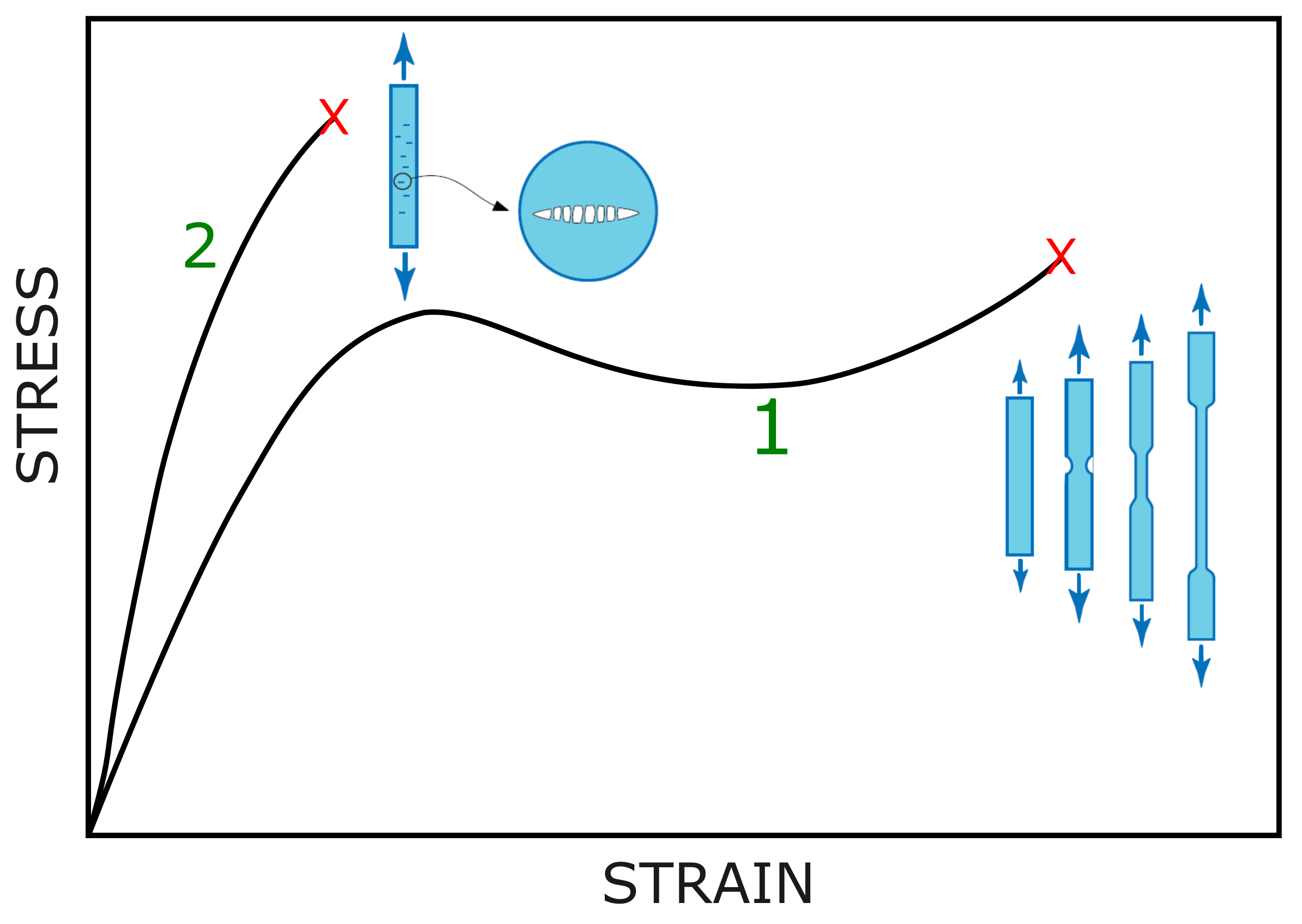
A constant strain rate stress-strain curve for a polymer, displaying 1) ductile failure (shear yielding) 2) brittle failure (craze yielding).

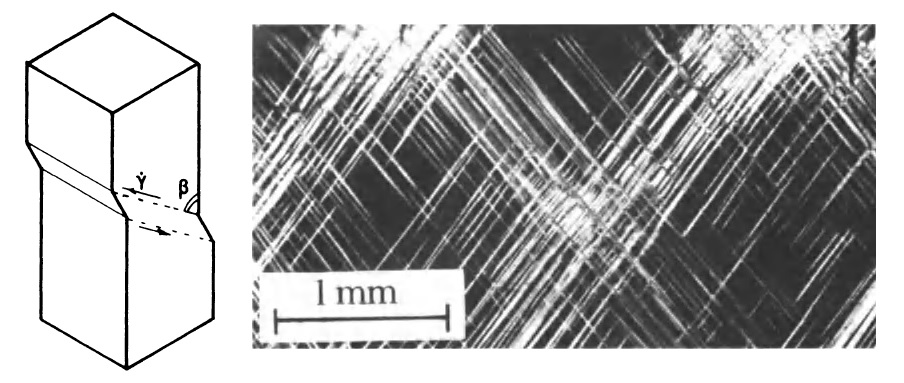
The left draw shows the mechanism of shear yielding. The right section cut from a PS sample reveals the dense network of shear bands.

The yield point of a material represents the maximum stress it can endure without resulting in a permanent strain after the load is removed, it refers to the stress level required to initiate plastic deformation. When analyzing the yielding behavior of polymers, it is crucial to differentiate between shear yielding and craze yielding due to their distinct microstructural characteristics. Shear yielding involves the material undergoing shear flow with minimal or no change in density. In contrast, craze yielding, is highly localized and the macroscopic behaviors of shear and craze yielding differ significantly.

Crazing and shear yielding are the two principal deformation mechanisms inherent to polymers. Those two phenomenon are competitive mechanisms (although they are not mutually exclusive and can coexist), with shear yielding being the more ductile failure mode because it involves the deformation of significant volume of the material while crazing is a more localized phenomenon ad it is more often associated with brittle failure. Shear yielding manifests as plastic deformation in the form of shear bands and is closely associated with the material softening that occurs immediately after yielding. With continued deformation, the material undergoes hardening due to molecular orientation, resulting in the multiplication and propagation of shear bands. Shear bands may form in a material that exhibits strain softening, hence when the conditions which favour crazing are suppressed, polymers will tend to form shear bands.

== Yielding criteria for polymers ==
=== Yielding criteria ===
The von Mises yield surfaces in principal stress coordinates circumscribes a cylinder with radius $\sqrt{\frac{2}{3}} \sigma_y$ around the hydrostatic axis. Also shown is Tresca's hexagonal yield surface.

A yield criterion is a general condition that must be satisfied by the applied stress tensor for yield to occur.

A yield criterion expressed in terms of stress can be visualized as a surface encompassing the origin in principal stress space. Yielding does not occur until the stress increases from zero (the origin) to some point on this surface. For isotropic elastic materials with a ductile failure mode, the most used criteria are the Tresca criterion of maximum tangential stress and von Mises yield criterion based on maximum distortion energy. The latter is the most used and states that yielding of a ductile material begins when the second invariant of deviatoric stress $I_2$ reaches a critical value.

$I_2=\frac{1}{6}\left[(\sigma_1 - \sigma_2)^2 + (\sigma_2 - \sigma_3)^2 + (\sigma_3 - \sigma_1)^2 \right]$

The criterion assumes that for yield to not occur the stress coordinate must be contained within the cylindrical surface described by the following equation:

$(\sigma_1 - \sigma_2)^2 + (\sigma_2 - \sigma_3)^2 + (\sigma_3 - \sigma_1)^2 = 9\tau_{oct}^2$

where $\tau_{oct}$ is the octahedral shear stress:

$\tau_{oct} = \frac{1}{3} \sqrt{(\sigma_1 - \sigma_2)^2 + (\sigma_2 - \sigma_3)^2 + (\sigma_3 - \sigma_1)^2}$

This criterion is observed quite well by most metals however it cannot be used to describe shear yielding in polymers since in those materials the hydrostatic component of the stress tensor affects the yield stress.

=== The modified von Mises criterion for shear yielding ===
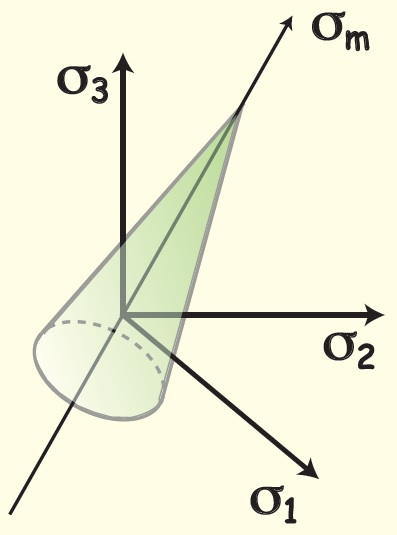
Modified von Mises criterion in principal stress coordinates.

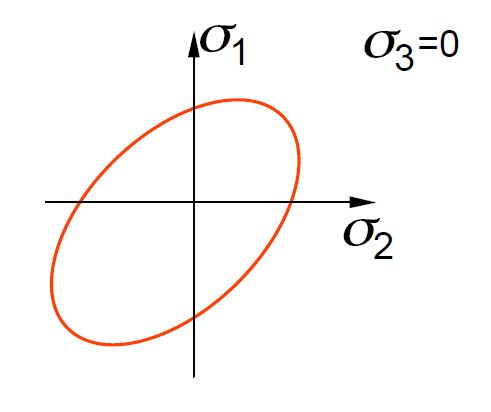
Modified von Mises criterion in principal stress coordinates (plane stress conditions).

Experiments have shown that nelther the Tresca nor the von Mises criterion adequately describes the shear yield behaviour of polymers, because for example the true yield stress is invariably higher in uniaxial compression than in tension, and uniaxial-tensile tests conducted in a pressure chamber show that yield stresses of polymers increase significantly with hydrostatic pressure.

The von Mises criterion can be modified to incorporate the effect of pressure on the state of the material by substituting in its original formulation:

$(\sigma_1 - \sigma_2)^2 + (\sigma_2 - \sigma_3)^2 + (\sigma_3 - \sigma_1)^2 = 9\tau_{oct}^2$

a value of $\tau_{oct}$ that is linearly dependent on the hydrostatic component of the stress tensor:

$\tau_{oct} = \tau_0-\mu \sigma_m$

while $\sigma_m$ represents the hydrostatic component:

$\sigma_m = \frac{\sigma_1 + \sigma_2 + \sigma_3}{3}$

$\tau_{0}$ and $\mu$ are material parameters that depend on loading rate and temperature. The constant $\tau_{0}$ is the yield stress in pure shear, since under this stress state the value of $\sigma_m$ is zero.

In plane stress the modified von Mises criterion is an ellipse on the principal axis space, but differently from the standard criterion it is shifted with respect to the origin, due to the different behavior of the polymeric materials depending on the hydrostatic component of the stress tensor.

=== Yielding criteria for crazing ===
An effective crazing criterion has been proposed in the early 70's by Sternstein and coworkers. Considering crazing a form of dilatational plasticity, a critical condition that has to be met by the applied stress tensor for crazing to take place is:

$\sigma_b = A(t,T) + \frac{B(t,T)}{I_1}$

where $\sigma_b$ is the stress required to orient the fibrils and $A$ and $B$ are time and temperature dependent parameters. $I_1$ Is the first stress invariant and it represent the dilatational component:

$I_1 = \sigma_1 + \sigma_2 + \sigma_3$

It is difficult to evaluate $\sigma_b$ for a general triaxial state of stress, but for what concerns the yield criterion, the constants A and B can be easily evaluated performing experiments in plane stress conditions ($\sigma_3 = 0$), so that the condition becomes:

$|\sigma_1-\sigma_2| = A + \frac{B}{\sigma_1+\sigma_2}$

The crazing criterion is illustrated in the following graph for different temperatures. The curves will be asymptotic to the pure shear line where $\sigma_1 = -\sigma_2$, that establishes the boundary between hydrostatic compression and hydrostatic tension. Below this line crazing does not occur because the pressure component of the stress matrix tends to reduce the volume, instead of increasing it.

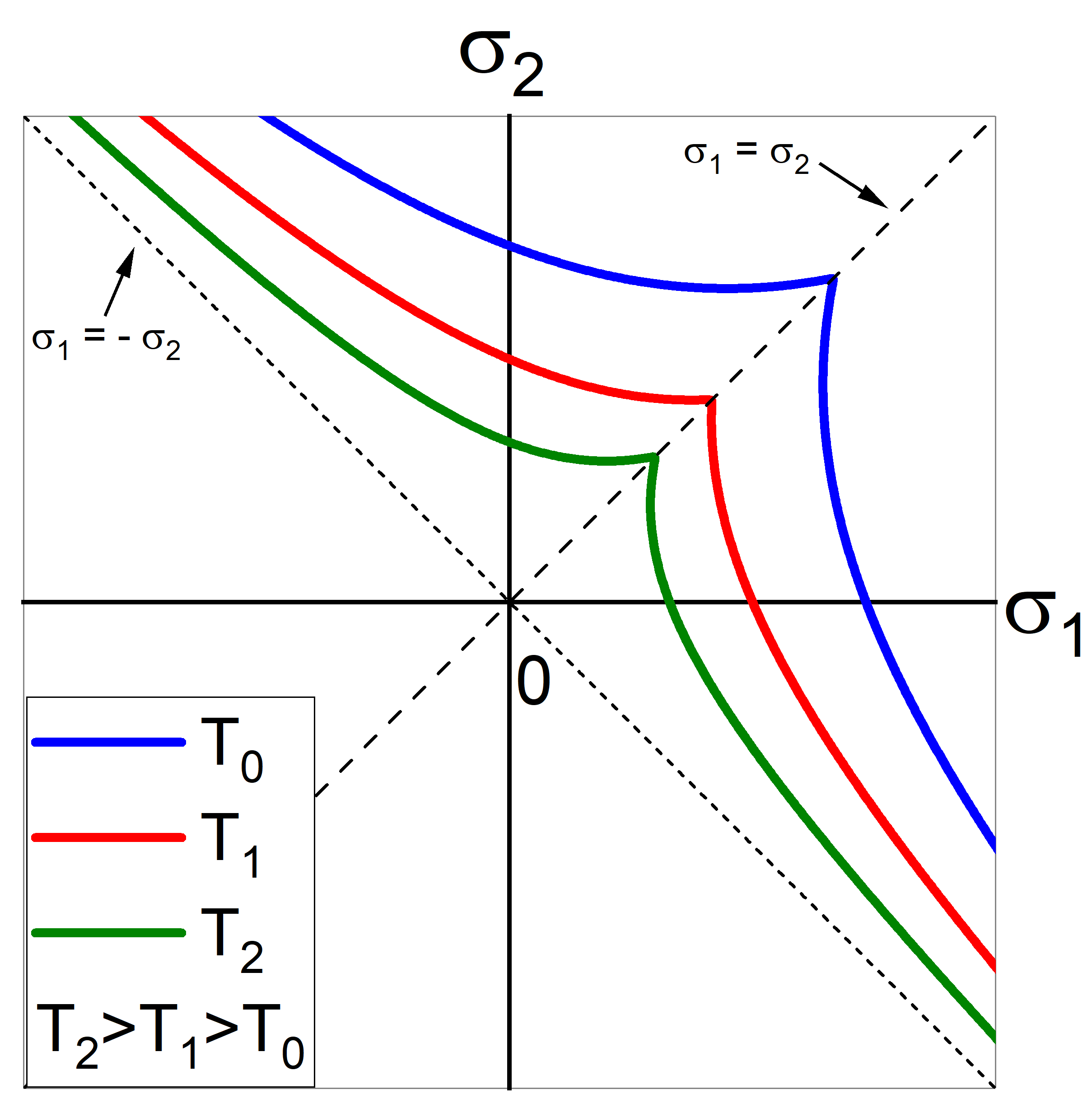
Sternstein crazing criterion at different temperatures for biaxial stress state. For a given temperature, crazing does not occur for any stress state below the curves.

Oxborough and Bowden attempted to create a more comprehensive relationship valid for a general triaxial state of stress. Their assumption is that crazing occurs when the strain in any direction reaches a critical value ($\epsilon_c$) that depends on the hydrostatic component of the stress tensor:

$\epsilon_c = Y_1(t,T) + \frac{X_1(t,T)}{I_1}$

Where $X_1$ and $Y_1$ are again time and temperature dependent parameters. The maximum tensile strain in an isotropic body under a general state of stress defined by the principal stresses is always in the direction of the maximum principal stress ($\sigma_1>\sigma_2>\sigma_3$) and is given by:

$\epsilon_1 = \frac{1}{E}(\sigma_1-\nu\sigma_2-\nu\sigma_3)$

where $E$ is Young's modulus and $\nu$ is Poisson's ratio. So the previous equation can be re-written as to define the criterion in terms of the principal stresses:

$\sigma_1-\nu\sigma_2-\nu\sigma_3 = Y_1E + \frac{X_1E}{\sigma_1+\sigma_2+\sigma_3}$

for plane stress this equation is very similar to the one proposed by Sternstein and coworkers.

Argon crazing criterion (blue) vs Sternstein (red dashed), plane stress conditions.

Argon proposed an alternative crazing criterion based on a molecular theory for distortional plasticity, he described the process of crazing as a micromechanical problem of elastic-plastic expansion of initially stable micropores produced by a thermally activated mechanism under stress to form a craze nucleus. With his analysis of the condition of craze nucleation he provided a derivation of crazing. This model provides an elegant criterion that can be easily applied for any stress state and it is not based on strain, which is a poor parameter of state:

$\tau_{oct}=\frac{C_1}{C_2+\sigma_m}$

where $\tau_{oct}$ is the octahedral shear stress, while $\sigma_m$ represents the hydrostatic component:

$\sigma_m = \frac{\sigma_1 + \sigma_2 + \sigma_3}{3}$

and $C_1$ and $C_2$ are time-temperature constants.

=== General yielding criterion ===
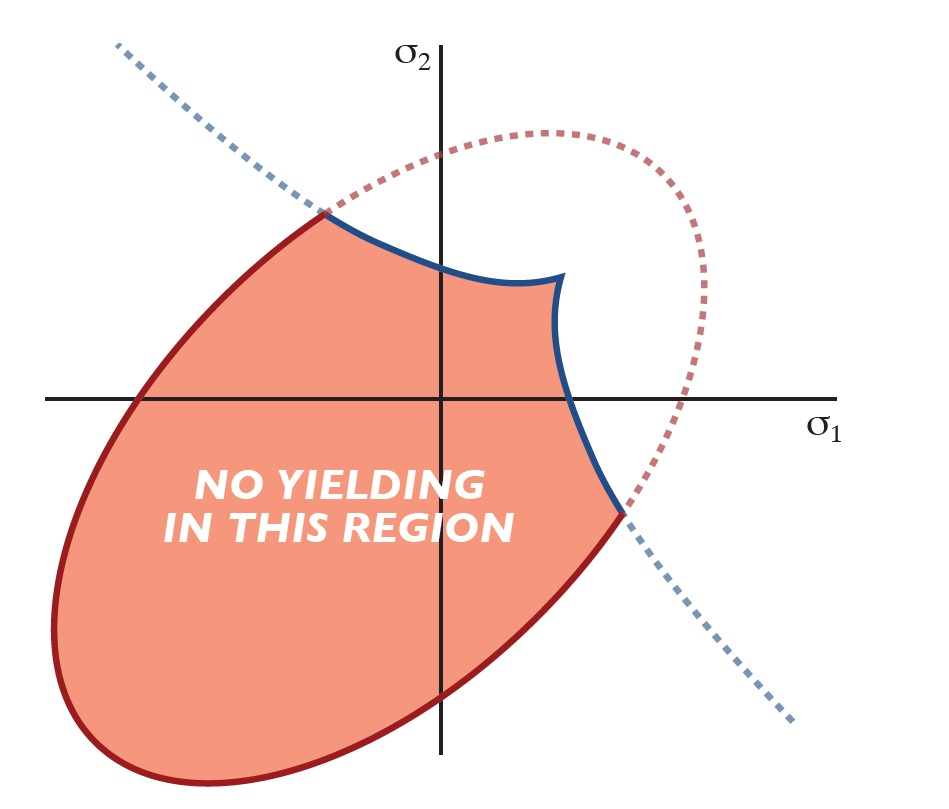
Example of a yield-safe region in plane stress condition, considering both shear yielding and craze yielding.

By combining the criterion for shear yielding and crazing a region can be found in which no yielding can occur. This can be easily seen in the $\sigma_1-\sigma_2$ plane (considering plane stress condition), where the two criteria intersect a transition between the two mechanisms is expected. Considering that polymers have a viscoelastic behaviour an effect of loading rates and temperatures on shear yield stress and on crazing yield is observed. When the loading conditions ($T,\dot{\epsilon}$) are such that the tensile stress for shear yielding is lower than the crazing stress no crazing will be observed on the material and a brittle to ductile transition can be expected.

In order to have a comprehensive yielding criterion both yielding phenomenon must be taken into account and their dependence on external parameters has to be determined. Only if these conditions are known a proper yield criterion expressed in terms of stress can obtained as a surface encompassing the origin in principal stress space.

== See also ==
- Fracture in polymers
- Environmental stress cracking
- Yield
- Viscoelasticity
- Rubber toughening
- Polymer physics
