= Palmqvist method =

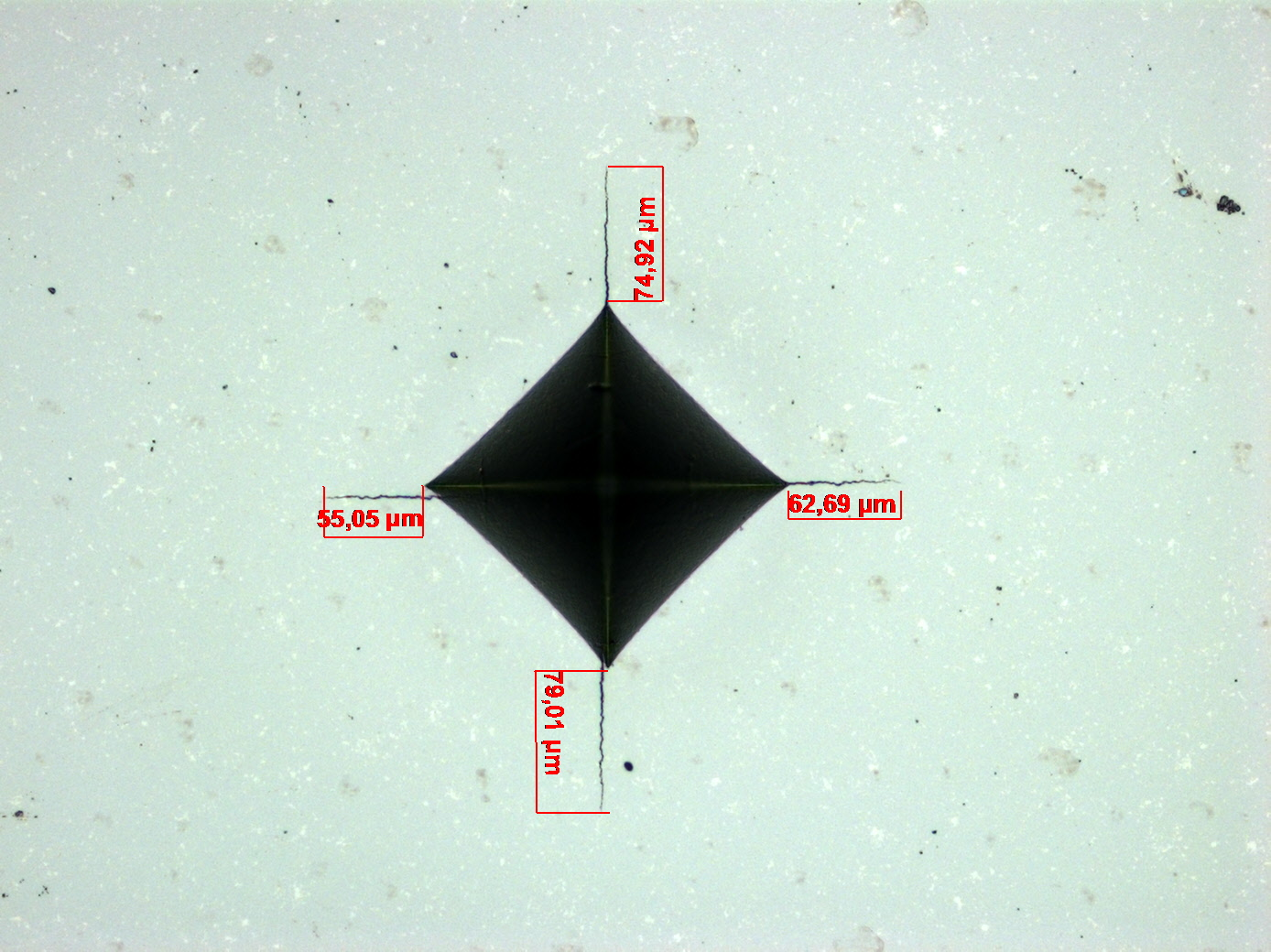
Determined crack lengths from a Vickers indention

The Palmqvist method, or the Palmqvist toughness test, (after Sven Robert Palmqvist) is a common method to determine the fracture toughness for cemented carbides. In this case, the material's fracture toughness is given by the critical stress intensity factor K_{Ic}. It was developed c. 1962.

== Approach ==
The Palmqvist-method uses the lengths of the cracks from a number of Vickers indentions to determine the fracture toughness. The Palmqvist fracture toughness is given by

$K_{\text{Ic}} = 0.0028\sqrt{\text{HV}}\sqrt{\frac{P}{T}}$ in units of MPa$\sqrt{\text{m}}$,

where HV is the Vickers hardness in N/mm^{2} (or MPa) (i.e., 9.81 x numerical HV), P is the indentation load in N (typically 30 kgf is used) and T is the total crack length (mm) after application of the indenter.
