= Crack growth resistance curve =

In fracture mechanics, a crack growth resistance curve shows the energy required for crack extension as a function of crack length in a given material. For materials that can be modeled with linear elastic fracture mechanics (LEFM), crack extension occurs when the applied energy release rate $G$ exceeds the material's resistance to crack extension $G_R$. A plot of crack growth resistance $G_R$ versus crack extension $\Delta a$ is called a crack growth resistance curve, or R-curve.

R-curves can alternatively be discussed in terms of stress intensity factors $(K)$ rather than energy release rates $(G)$, where the R-curves can be expressed as the fracture toughness ($K_{Ic}$, sometimes referred to as $K_{R}$) as a function of crack length $a$.

== Definition ==
Conceptually, the energy release rate $G$, can be thought of as the energetic gain associated with an additional infinitesimal increment of crack extension, while $G_R$ can be thought of as the energetic penalty of an additional infinitesimal increment of crack extension. At any moment in time, if $G \geq G_R$ then crack extension is energetically favorable. A complication to this process is that in some materials, $G_R$ is not a constant value during the crack extension process. A plot of energy release rate $G$ versus crack extension $\Delta a$ for a particular loading configuration is called the driving force curve. The nature of the applied driving force curve relative to the material's R-curve determines the stability of a given crack.

The usage of R-curves in fracture analysis is a more complex, but more comprehensive failure criteria compared to the common failure criteria that fracture occurs when $G \geq G_c$ where $G_c$ is simply a constant value called the critical energy release rate. An R-curve based failure analysis takes into account the notion that a material's resistance to fracture is not necessarily constant during crack growth.

== Types of R-Curves ==
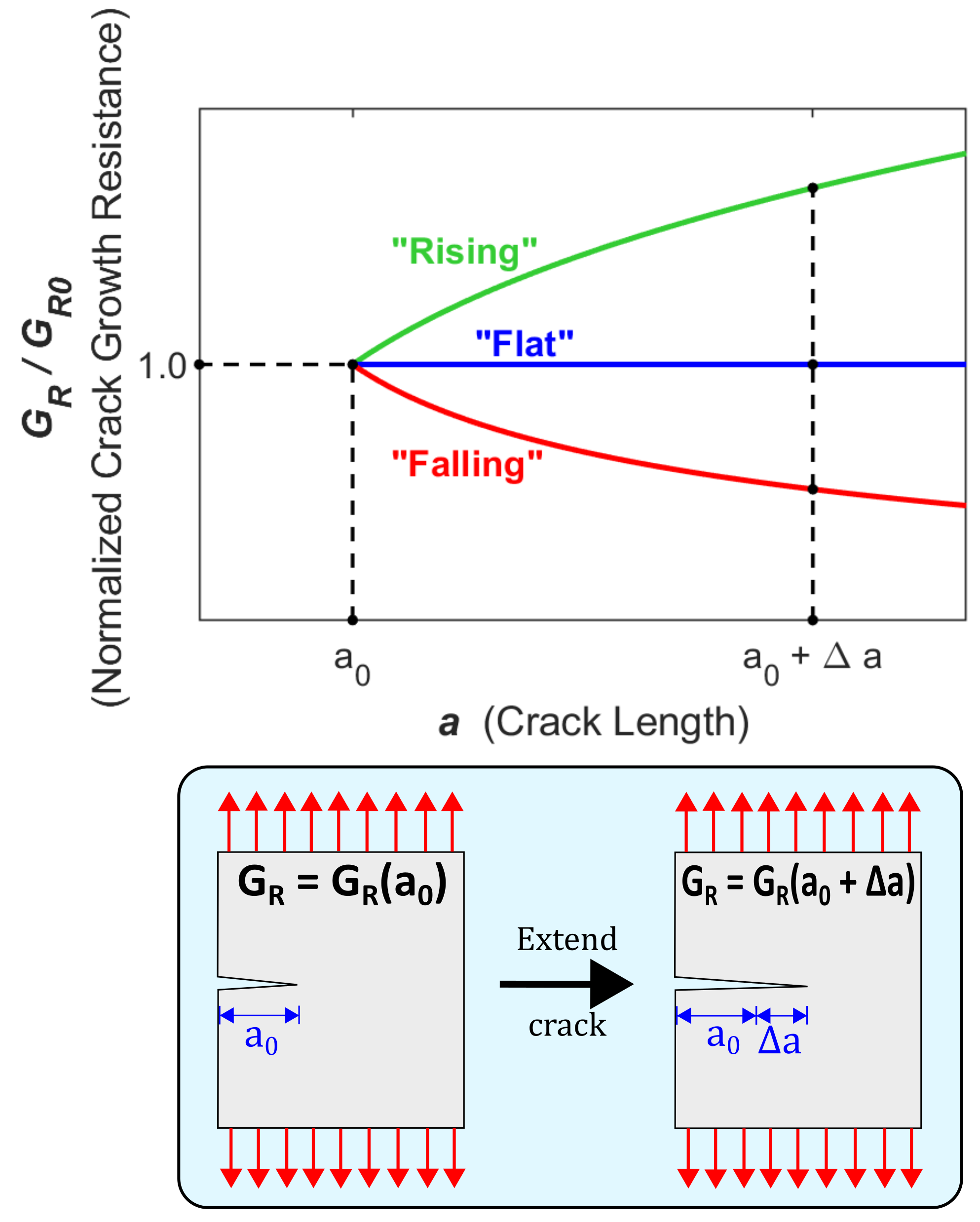
A schematic depicting how $G_R$ varies with crack length for the three canonical R-curve types. All curves are normalized to their initial crack growth resistance $G_{R0}$ where $G_{R0} = G_R(a_0)$.

=== Flat R-Curves ===
The simplest case of a material's crack resistance curve would be materials which exhibit a "flat R-curve" ($G_R$ is constant with respect to $\Delta a$). In materials with flat R-curves (the shape of R curve depends on the material properties and more importantly on the crack tip plasticity. The reduction in stress intensity factor due to high deformation can result in a flat R curve), as a crack propagates, the resistance to further crack propagation remains constant. Thus, the common failure criteria of $G \geq G_c$ is largely valid. In these materials, if $G$ increases as a function of $\Delta a$ (which is the case in many loading configurations and crack geometries), then as soon as the applied $G$ exceeds $G_c$ the crack will unstably grow to failure without ever halting.

Physically, the independence of $G_R$ from $\Delta a$ is indicative that in these materials the phenomena which are energetically costly during crack propagation do not evolve during crack propagation. This tends to be an accurate model for perfectly brittle materials such as ceramics, in which the principal energetic cost of fracture is the development of new free surfaces on the crack faces. The character of the energetic cost of the creation of new surfaces remains largely unchanged regardless of how long the crack has propagated from its initial length.

=== Rising R-Curves ===
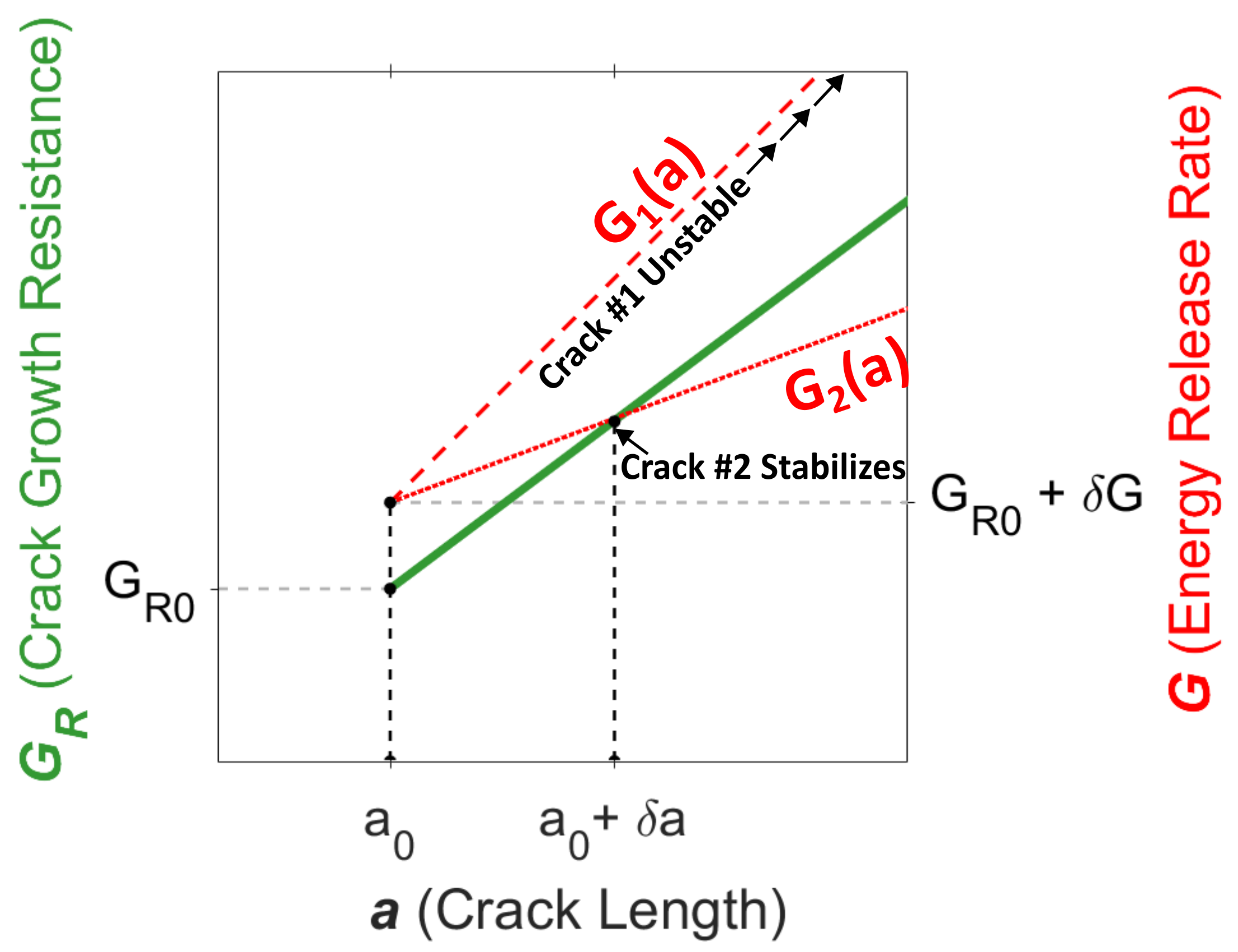
A schematic depicting how a material's rising R-curve leads to added crack stability. Two different crack driving force curves are applied to the material, $G_1(a)$ and $G_2(a)$. Even though both are initially unstable, due to their different slopes $G_1(a)$ will unstably propagate the crack while $G_2(a)$ will arrest the crack after propagating it a short distance $\delta a$.

Another category of R-curve that is common in real materials is a "rising R-curve" ($G_R$ increases as $\Delta a$ increases). In materials with rising R-curves, as a crack propagates, the resistance to further crack propagation increases, and it requires a higher and higher applied $G$ in order to achieve each subsequent increment of crack extension $\delta a$. As such, it can be technically challenging in these materials in practice to define a single value to quantify resistance to fracture (i.e. $G_c$ or $K_{Ic}$) as the resistance to fracture rises continuously as any given crack propagates.

Materials with rising R-curves can also more easily exhibit stable crack growth than materials with flat R-curves, even if $G$ strictly increases as a function of $a$. If at some moment in time a crack exists with initial length $a_0$ and an applied energy release rate which is infinitesimally exceeding the R-curve at this crack length $[G(a_0) = G_R(a_0) + \delta G]$ then this material would immediately fail if it exhibited flat R-curve behavior. If instead it exhibits rising R-curve behavior, then the crack has an added criteria for crack growth that the instantaneous slope of the driving force curve must be greater than the instantaneous slope of the crack resistance curve $\Biggl(\frac{\delta G(a_0)}{\delta a} \geq \frac{\delta G_R(a_0)}{\delta a}\Biggr)$ or else it is energetically unfavorable to grow the crack further. If $G(a_0)$ is infinitesimally greater than $G_R(a_0)$ but $\frac{\delta G(a_0)}{\delta a} \leq \frac{\delta G_R(a_0)}{\delta a}$ then the crack will grow by an infinitesimally small increment $\delta a$ such that $G(a_0 + \delta a) = G_R(a_0 + \delta a)$ and then crack growth will arrest. If the applied crack driving force $G(a)$ was gradually increased over time (through increasing the applied force for example) then this would lead to stable crack growth in this material as long as the instantaneous slope of the driving force curve continued to be less than the slope of the crack resistance curve.

Physically, the dependence of $G_R$ on $\Delta a$ is indicative that in rising R-curve materials, the phenomena which are energetically costly during crack propagation are evolving as the crack grows in such a way that leads to accelerated energy dissipation during crack growth. This tends to be the case in materials which undergo ductile fracture as it can be observed that the plastic zone at the crack tip increases in size as the crack propagates, indicating that an increasing amount of energy must be dissipated to plastic deformation for the crack to continue to grow. A rising R-curve can also sometimes be observed in situations where a material's fracture surface becomes significantly rougher as the crack propagates, leading to additional energy dissipation as additional area of free surfaces is generated.

In theory, $G_R$ does not continue to increase to infinity as $a \rightarrow \infty$, and instead will asymptotically approach some steady-state value after a finite amount of crack growth. It is usually not feasible to reach this steady-state condition, as it often requires very long crack extensions before reaching this condition, and thus would require large testing specimen geometries (and thus high applied forces) to observe. As such, most materials with rising R-curves are treated as if $G_R$ continually rises until failure.

=== Falling R-Curves ===
While far less common, some materials can exhibit falling R-curves ($G_R$ decreases as $\Delta a$ increases). In some cases, the material may initially exhibit rising R-curve behavior, reach a steady-state condition, and then transition into falling R-curve behavior. In a falling R-curve regime, as a crack propagates, the resistance to further crack propagation drops, and it requires less and less applied $G$ in order to achieve each subsequent increment of crack extension $\delta a$. Materials experiencing these conditions would exhibit highly unstable crack growth as soon as any initial crack began to propagate.

Polycrystalline graphite has been reported to demonstrate falling R-curve behavior after initially exhibiting rising R-curve behavior, which is postulated to be due to the gradual development of a microcracking damage zone in front of the crack tip which eventually dominates after the phenomena leading to the initial rising R-curve behavior reach steady-state.

== Effect of size and shape ==
Size and geometry also plays a role in determining the shape of the R curve. A crack in a thin sheet tends to produce a steeper R curve than a crack in a thick plate because there is a low degree of stress triaxiality at the crack tip in the thin sheet while the material near the tip of the crack in the thick plate may be in plane strain. The R curve can also change at free boundaries in the structure. Thus, a wide plate may exhibit a somewhat different crack growth resistance behavior than a narrow plate of the same material. Ideally, the R curve, as well as other measures of fracture toughness, is a property only of the material and does not depend on the size or shape of the cracked body. Much of fracture mechanics is predicated on the assumption that fracture toughness is a material property.

== Testing ==
ASTM evolved a standard practice for determining R-curves to accommodate the widespread need for this type of data. While the materials to which this standard practice can be applied are not restricted by strength, thickness or toughness, the test specimens must be of sufficient size to remain predominantly elastic throughout the test. The size requirement is to ensure the validity of the linear elastic fracture mechanics calculations. Specimens of standard proportions are required, but size is variable, adjusted for yield strength and toughness of the material considered.

ASTM Standard E561 covers the determination of R-curves using a middle cracked tension panel [M(T)], compact tension [C(T)], and crack-line-wedge-loaded [C(W)] specimens. While the C(W) specimen had gained substantial popularity for collecting KR curve data, many organizations still conduct wide panel, center cracked tension tests to obtain fracture toughness data. As with the plane-strain fracture toughness standard, ASTM E399, the planar dimensions of the specimens are sized to ensure that nominal elastic conditions are met. For the M(T) specimen, the width (W) and half crack size (a) must be chosen so that the remaining ligament is below net section yielding at failure.
