= Fracture toughness =

Stress intensity factor at which a crack's propagation increases drastically

Impact of specimen thickness on fracture toughness

In materials science, fracture toughness is the critical stress intensity factor of a sharp crack where propagation of the crack suddenly becomes rapid and unlimited. It is a material property that quantifies its ability to resist crack propagation and failure under applied stress. A component's thickness affects the constraint conditions at the tip of a crack with thin components having plane stress conditions, leading to ductile behavior and thick components having plane strain conditions, where the constraint increases, leading to brittle failure. Plane strain conditions give the lowest fracture toughness value which is a material property. The critical value of stress intensity factor in mode I loading measured under plane strain conditions is known as the plane strain fracture toughness, denoted $K_\text{Ic}$. When a test fails to meet the thickness and other test requirements that are in place to ensure plane strain conditions, the fracture toughness value produced is given the designation $K_\text{c}$.

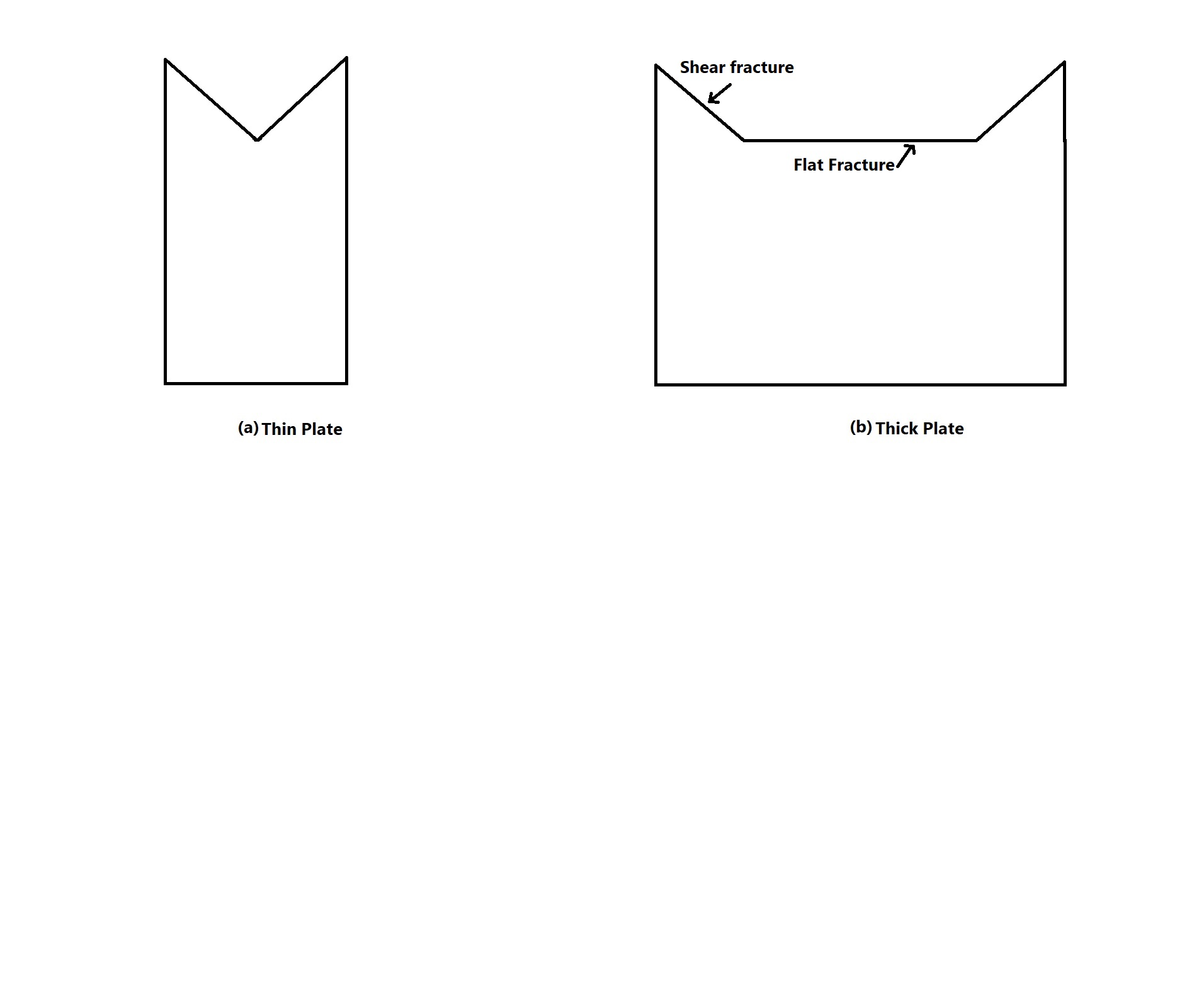
Morphology of fracture surfaces in materials that display ductile crack growth is influenced by changes in specimen thickness.

Slow self-sustaining crack propagation known as stress corrosion cracking, can occur in a corrosive environment above the threshold $K_\text{Iscc}$ (Stress Corrosion Cracking Threshold Stress Intensity Factor) and below $K_\text{Ic}$. Small increments of crack extension can also occur during fatigue crack growth, which after repeated loading cycles, can gradually grow a crack until final failure occurs by exceeding the fracture toughness.

== Material variation ==
Material type	Material	K_{Ic} (MPa·m^{1/2})
Metal	Aluminum	14–28
Metal	Aluminum alloy (7075)	20–35
Metal	Inconel 718	73–87
Metal	Maraging steel (200 Grade)	175
Metal	Steel alloy (4340)	50
Metal	Titanium alloy	84–107
Ceramic	Aluminum oxide	3–5
Ceramic	Silicon carbide	3–5
Ceramic	Soda-lime glass	0.7–0.8
Ceramic	Concrete	0.2–1.4
Polymer	Polymethyl methacrylate	0.7–1.60
Polymer	Polystyrene	0.7–1.1
Composite	Mullite-fibre composite	1.8–3.3
Composite	Silica aerogels	0.0008–0.0048

Fracture toughness varies by approximately 4 orders of magnitude across materials. Metals hold the highest values of fracture toughness and ceramics holds the lowest. Cracks cannot easily propagate in tough materials, making metals highly resistant to cracking under stress and gives their stress–strain curve a large zone of plastic flow. Even though ceramics have a lower fracture toughness they show an exceptional improvement in the stress fracture that is attributed to their 1.5 orders of magnitude strength increase, relative to metals. The fracture toughness of composites, made by combining engineering ceramics with engineering polymers, greatly exceeds the individual fracture toughness of the constituent materials.

== Mechanisms ==
=== Intrinsic mechanisms ===
Intrinsic toughening mechanisms are processes which act ahead of the crack tip to increase the material's toughness. These mechanisms operate at the atomic or microscopic level and are fundamental to the material itself, rather than being influenced by external factors. These will tend to be related to the structure and bonding of the base material, as well as microstructural features and additives to it. Examples of mechanisms include:

- crack deflection by secondary phases,
- crack separation due to fine grain structure
- changes in the crack path due to grain boundaries

Any alteration to the base material which increases its ductility can also be thought of as intrinsic toughening.

==== Grain boundaries ====
The presence of grains in a material can also affect its toughness by affecting the way cracks propagate. In front of a crack, a plastic zone can be present as the material yields. Beyond that region, the material remains elastic. The conditions for fracture are the most favorable at the boundary between this plastic and elastic zone, and thus cracks often initiate by the cleavage of a grain at that location.

At low temperatures, where the material can become completely brittle, such as in a body-centered cubic (BCC) metal, the plastic zone shrinks away, and only the elastic zone exists. In this state, the crack will propagate by successive cleavage of the grains. At these low temperatures, the yield strength is high, but the fracture strain and crack tip radius of curvature are low, leading to a low toughness.

Additionally, the lack of plastic deformation at low temperatures results in minimal energy absorption before fracture, making the material highly susceptible to sudden and catastrophic failure. This brittle behavior is particularly critical in structural applications, where impact loading or stress concentrations can rapidly initiate fracture. The ductile-to-brittle transition temperature (DBTT) defines the temperature below which a material exhibits this brittle nature, and in BCC metals, it varies based on factors such as impurity content, grain size, and alloying elements. Engineering solutions, such as grain refinement or controlled heat treatments, are often employed to lower the DBTT and improve low-temperature toughness. Furthermore, external factors like strain rate and triaxial stress states can exacerbate brittleness, making careful material selection crucial for applications operating in cold environments.

At higher temperatures, the yield strength decreases, and leads to the formation of the plastic zone. Cleavage is likely to initiate at the elastic-plastic zone boundary, and then link back to the main crack tip. This is usually a mixture of cleavages of grains, and ductile fracture of grains known as fibrous linkages. The percentage of fibrous linkages increase as temperature increases until the linkup is entirely fibrous linkages. In this state, even though yield strength is lower, the presence of ductile fracture and a higher crack tip radius of curvature results in a higher toughness.

Additionally, the increased plasticity at elevated temperatures enhances energy dissipation during crack propagation, further improving material toughness. The transition from brittle to ductile fracture is also influenced by strain rate and microstructural factors, such as grain size and phase composition. Materials with finer grains tend to exhibit higher resistance to crack initiation due to increased grain boundary interactions. Furthermore, oxidation effects at high temperatures can play a role in altering crack behavior, either enhancing or reducing toughness depending on the material and environmental conditions.

==== Inclusions ====
Inclusions in a material such as a second phase particles can act similar to brittle grains that can affect crack propagation. Fracture or separation at an inclusion can occur either due to external stress or because of dislocations that form as the inclusion tries to stay connected with the surrounding material. Similar to grains, the fracture is most likely to occur at the plastic-elastic zone boundary. Then the crack can linkup back to the main crack. If the plastic zone is small or the density of the inclusions is small, the fracture is more likely to directly link up with the main crack tip. If the plastic zone is large, or the density of inclusions is high, additional inclusion fractures may occur within the plastic zone, and linkup occurs by progressing from the crack to the closest fracturing inclusion within the zone.

==== Transformation toughening ====
Transformation toughening is a phenomenon whereby a material undergoes one or more martensitic (displacive, diffusionless) phase transformations which result in an almost instantaneous change in volume of that material. This transformation is triggered by a change in the stress state of the material, such as an increase in tensile stress, and acts in opposition to the applied stress. Thus when the material is locally put under tension, for example at the tip of a growing crack, it can undergo a phase transformation which increases its volume, lowering the local tensile stress and hindering the crack's progression through the material. This mechanism is exploited to increase the toughness of ceramic materials, most notably in Yttria-stabilized zirconia for applications such as ceramic knives and thermal barrier coatings on jet engine turbine blades.

A similar toughening process, albeit without volume change, can occur in materials in which the crystallographic unit cell can change its orientation due to an external load. In this case the crack-tip stress field will result in unit cells to re-align in the tensile stress direction, thus reducing the tensile stress. Since this process does not include a crystallographic phase transition, the unit cell volume remains constant. A good example of such behavior is found in soft lead zirconate titanate piezo-ceramics. Unlike in a traditional phase transformation, this process is in general reversible. Also, the original orientation of the unit cell is critical as the toughening effect cannot occur if the unit cell is already aligned with the tensile stress direction.

=== Extrinsic mechanisms ===
Extrinsic toughening mechanisms are processes which act behind the crack tip to resist its further opening. Examples include

- fibre/lamella bridging, where these structures hold the two fracture surfaces together after the crack has propagated through the matrix,
- crack wedging from the friction between two rough fracture surfaces, and
- microcracking, where smaller cracks form in the material around the main crack, relieving the stress at the crack tip by effectively increasing the material's compliance.

== Test methods ==
Fracture toughness tests are performed to quantify the resistance of a material to failure by cracking. Such tests result in either a single-valued measure of fracture toughness or in a resistance curve. Resistance curves are plots where fracture toughness parameters (K, J etc.) are plotted against parameters characterizing the propagation of crack. The resistance curve or the single-valued fracture toughness is obtained based on the mechanism and stability of fracture. Fracture toughness is a critical mechanical property for engineering applications. There are several types of test used to measure fracture toughness of materials, which generally utilise a notched specimen in one of various configurations. A widely utilized standardized test method is the Charpy impact test whereby a sample with a V-notch or a U-notch is subjected to impact from behind the notch. Also widely used are crack displacement tests such as three-point beam bending tests with thin cracks preset into test specimens before applying load.

=== Testing requirements ===
==== Choice of specimen ====
The ASTM standard E1820 for the measurement of fracture toughness recommends three coupon types for fracture toughness testing, the single-edge bending coupon [SE(B)], the compact tension coupon [C(T)] and the disk-shaped compact tension coupon [DC(T)]. Each specimen configuration is characterized by three dimensions, namely the crack length (a), the thickness (B) and the width (W). The values of these dimensions are determined by the demand of the particular test that is being performed on the specimen. The vast majority of the tests are carried out on either compact or three-point flexural test configuration. For the same characteristic dimensions, compact configuration takes a lesser amount of material compared to three-point flexural test.

==== Material orientation ====
Orientation of fracture is important because of the inherent non-isotropic nature of most engineering materials. Due to this, there may be planes of weakness within the material, and crack growth along this plane may be easier compared to other direction. Due to this importance ASTM has devised a standardized way of reporting the crack orientation with respect to forging axis. The letters L, T and S are used to denote the longitudinal, transverse and short transverse directions, where the longitudinal direction coincides with forging axis. The orientation is defined with two letters the first one being the direction of principal tensile stress and the second one is the direction of crack propagation. Generally speaking, the lower bound of the toughness of a material is obtained in the orientation where the crack grows in the direction of forging axis.

==== Pre-cracking ====
For accurate results, a sharp crack is required before testing. Machined notches and slots do not meet this criterion. The most effective way of introducing a sufficiently sharp crack is by applying cyclic loading to grow a fatigue crack from a slot. Fatigue cracks are initiated at the tip of the slot and allowed to extend until the crack length reaches its desired value.

The cyclic loading is controlled carefully so as to not affect the toughness of the material through strain-hardening. This is done by choosing cyclic loads that produce a far smaller plastic zone compared to plastic zone of the main fracture. For example, according to ASTM E399, the maximum stress intensity K_{max} should be no larger than 0.6$K_\text{Ic}$ during the initial stage and less than 0.8$K_\text{Ic}$ when crack approaches its final size.

In certain cases grooves are machined into the sides of a fracture toughness specimen so that the thickness of the specimen is reduced to a minimum of 80% of the original thickness along the intended path of crack extensions. The reason is to maintain a straight crack front during R-curve test.

The four main standardized tests are described below with K_{Ic} and K_{R} tests valid for linear-elastic fracture mechanics (LEFM) while J and J_{R} tests valid for elastic-plastic fracture mechanics (EPFM).

===== Plane-strain fracture toughness testing =====
When performing a fracture toughness test, the most common test specimen configurations are the single edge notch bend (SENB or three-point bend), and the compact tension (CT) specimens. Testing has shown that plane-strain conditions generally prevail when:

$$B,a\geq2.5\left(\frac{K_{IC}}{\sigma_\text{YS}}\right)^2$$
where $B$ is the minimum necessary thickness, $K_\text{Ic}$ the fracture toughness of the material and $\sigma_\text{YS}$ is the material yield strength.

The test is performed by loading steadily at a rate such that K_{I} increases from 0.55 to 2.75 (MPa$\sqrt{m}$)/s. During the test, the load and the crack mouth opening displacement (CMOD) is recorded and the test is continued till the maximum load is reached. The critical load P_{Q} is calculated through from the load vs CMOD plot. A provisional toughness K_{Q} is given as

$$K_Q=\frac{P_Q}{\sqrt{W}B}f(a/W,...)$$.

The geometry factor $f(a/W,...)$ is a dimensionless function of a/W and is given in polynomial form in the E 399 standard. The geometry factor for compact test geometry can be found here. This provisional toughness value is recognized as valid when the following requirements are met:

$$min(B,a)>2.5\left(\frac{K_{Q}}{\sigma_\text{YS}}\right)^2$$
and $P_{max}\leq 1.1P_Q$

When a material of unknown fracture toughness is tested, a specimen of full material section thickness is tested or the specimen is sized based on a prediction of the fracture toughness. If the fracture toughness value resulting from the test does not satisfy the requirement of the above equation, the test must be repeated using a thicker specimen. In addition to this thickness calculation, test specifications have several other requirements that must be met (such as the size of the shear lips) before a test can be said to have resulted in a K_{IC} value.

When a test fails to meet the thickness and other plain-strain requirements, the fracture toughness value produced is given the designation K_{c}. Sometimes, it is not possible to produce a specimen that meets the thickness requirement. For example, when a relatively thin plate with high toughness is being tested, it might not be possible to produce a thicker specimen with plane-strain conditions at the crack tip.

=== Determination of R-curve, K-R ===
The specimen showing stable crack growth shows an increasing trend in fracture toughness as the crack length increases (ductile crack extension). This plot of fracture toughness vs crack length is called the resistance (R)-curve. ASTM E561 outlines a procedure for determining toughness vs crack growth curves in materials. This standard does not have a constraint over the minimum thickness of the material and hence can be used for thin sheets however the requirements for LEFM must be fulfilled for the test to be valid. The criteria for LEFM essentially states that in-plane dimension has to be large compared to the plastic zone. There is a misconception about the effect of thickness on the shape of R curve. It is hinted that for the same material thicker section fails by plane strain fracture and shows a single-valued fracture toughness, the thinner section fails by plane stress fracture and shows the rising R-curve. However, the main factor that controls the slope of R curve is the fracture morphology not the thickness. In some material section thickness changes the fracture morphology from ductile tearing to cleavage from thin to thick section, in which case the thickness alone dictates the slope of R-curve. There are cases where even plane strain fracture ensues in rising R-curve due to "microvoid coalescence" being the mode of failure.

The most accurate way of evaluating K-R curve is taking presence of plasticity into account depending on the relative size of the plastic zone. For the case of negligible plasticity, the load vs displacement curve is obtained from the test and on each point the compliance is found. The compliance is reciprocal of the slope of the curve that will be followed if the specimen is unloaded at a certain point, which can be given as the ratio of displacement to load for LEFM. The compliance is used to determine the instantaneous crack length through the relationship given in the ASTM standard.

The stress intensity should be corrected by calculating an effective crack length. ASTM standard suggests two alternative approaches. The first method is named Irwin's plastic zone correction. Irwin's approach describes the effective crack length $a_\text{eff}$ to be

$$a_\text{eff}=a+\frac{1}{2\pi}\left(\frac{K}{\sigma_{YS}}\right)^2$$

Irwin's approach leads to an iterative solution as K itself is a function of crack length.

The other method, namely the secant method, uses the compliance-crack length equation given by ASTM standard to calculate effective crack length from an effective compliance. Compliance at any point in Load vs displacement curve is essentially the reciprocal of the slope of the curve that ensues if the specimen is unloaded at that point. Now the unloading curve returns to the origin for linear elastic material but not for elastic plastic material as there is a permanent deformation. The effective compliance at a point for the elastic plastic case is taken as the slope of the line joining the point and origin (i.e the compliance if the material was an elastic one). This effective compliance is used to get an effective crack growth and the rest of the calculation follows the equation

$$K_I=\frac{P}{\sqrt{W}B} f(a_\text{eff}/W,...)$$

The choice of plasticity correction is factored on the size of plastic zone. ASTM standard covering resistance curve suggests using Irwin's method is acceptable for small plastic zone and recommends using Secant method when crack-tip plasticity is more prominent. Also since the ASTM E 561 standard does not contain requirements on the specimen size or maximum allowable crack extension, thus the size independence of the resistance curve is not guaranteed. Few studies show that the size dependence is less detected in the experimental data for the Secant method.

=== Determination of J_{IC} ===
Strain energy release rate per unit fracture surface area is calculated by J-integral method which is a contour path integral around the crack tip where the path begins and ends on either crack surfaces. J-toughness value signifies the resistance of the material in terms of amount of stress energy required for a crack to grow. J_{IC} toughness value is measured for elastic-plastic materials. Now the single-valued J_{IC} is determined as the toughness near the onset of the ductile crack extension (effect of strain hardening is not important). The test is performed with multiple specimen loading each of the specimen to various levels and unloading. This gives the crack mouth opening compliance which is to be used to get crack length with the help of relationships given in ASTM standard E 1820, which covers the J-integral testing. Another way of measuring crack growth is to mark the specimen with heat tinting or fatigue cracking. The specimen is eventually broken apart and the crack extension is measured with the help of the marks.

The test thus performed yields several load vs crack mouth opening displacement (CMOD) curves, which are used to calculate J as following:-

$$J=J_{el}+J_{pl}$$

The linear elastic J is calculated using $J_{el}=\frac{K^2\left(1-\nu^2\right)}{E}$ and K is determined from $K_I=\frac{P}{\sqrt{WBB_N}} f(a/W,...)$ where $B_N$ is the net thickness for side-grooved specimen and equal to B for not side-grooved specimen.

The elastic plastic J is calculated using

$$J_\mathrm{pl}=\frac{\eta A_\mathrm{pl}}{B_Nb_o}$$

Where

- $\eta$ = 2 for SENB specimen
- $b_o$ is initial ligament length given by the difference between width and initial crack length
- $A_\mathrm{pl}$ is the plastic area under the load-displacement curve.

Specialized data reduction technique is used to get a provisional $J_Q$. The value is accepted if the following criterion is met:

$$\min(B,b_o)\geq\frac{25J_Q}{\sigma_\text{YS}}$$

==== Work of fracture ====
Work of fracture is a conceptual term for the amount of energy required to completely tear a sample apart, divided by the cross-sectional area. This is related to J_{IC}. In brittle materials like glass, the energy required is low, and is governed by linear elastic fracture mechanics (LEFM). The energy is higher in ductile materials, like steel, which involve plastic deformation.

=== Determination of tear resistance (Kahn tear test) ===
The tear test (e.g. Kahn tear test) provides a semi-quantitative measure of toughness in terms of tear resistance. This type of test requires a smaller specimen, and can, therefore, be used for a wider range of product forms. The tear test can also be used for very ductile aluminium alloys (e.g. 1100, 3003), where linear elastic fracture mechanics do not apply.

=== Standard test methods ===
A number of organizations publish standards related to fracture toughness measurements, namely ASTM, BSI, ISO, JSME.

- ASTM C1161 Test Method for Flexural Strength of Advanced Ceramics at Ambient Temperature
- ASTM C1421 Standard Test Methods for Determination of Fracture Toughness of Advanced Ceramics at Ambient Temperature
- ASTM E399 Test Method for Plane-strain Fracture Toughness of Metallic Materials
- ASTM E740 Practice for Fracture Testing with Surface-Crack Tension Specimens
- ASTM E1820 Standard Test Method for Measurement of Fracture Toughness
- ASTM E1823 Terminology Relating to Fatigue and Fracture Testing
- ISO 12135 Metallic materials — Unified method of test for the determination of quasistatic fracture toughness
- ISO 28079:2009, the Palmqvist method, used to determine the fracture toughness for cemented carbides

== Crack deflection toughening ==
Many ceramics with polycrystalline structures develop large cracks that propagate along the boundaries between grains, rather than through the individual crystals themselves since the toughness of the grain boundaries is much lower than that of the crystals. The orientation of the grain boundary facets and residual stress cause the crack to advance in a complex, tortuous manner that is difficult to analyze. Simply calculating the additional surface energy associated with the increased grain boundary surface area due to this tortuosity is not accurate, as some of the energy to create the crack surface comes from the residual stress.

=== Faber–Evans model ===
A mechanics of materials model, introduced by Katherine Faber and Anthony G. Evans, has been developed to predict the increase in fracture toughness in ceramics due to crack deflection around second-phase particles that are prone to microcracking in a matrix. The model takes into account the particle morphology, aspect ratio, spacing, and volume fraction of the second phase, as well as the reduction in local stress intensity at the crack tip when the crack is deflected or the crack plane bows. The actual crack tortuosity is obtained through imaging techniques, allowing the deflection and bowing angles to be directly input into the model.

The resulting increase in fracture toughness is then compared to that of a flat crack through the plain matrix. The magnitude of the toughening is determined by the mismatch strain caused by thermal contraction incompatibility and the microfracture resistance of the particle/matrix interface. This toughening becomes noticeable when there is a narrow size distribution of particles that are appropriately sized. Researchers typically accept the findings of Faber's analysis, which suggest that deflection effects in materials with roughly equiaxial grains may increase the fracture toughness by about twice the grain boundary value.

== See also ==
- Brittle–ductile transition zone
- Charpy impact test
- Ductile-brittle transition temperature
- Impact (mechanics)
- Izod impact strength test
- Puncture resistance
- Shock (mechanics)
- Three-point flexural fracture toughness testing
- Toughness of ceramics by indentation
