= Fatigue of welded joints =

Small defects from welding propagate into failures after repeated loading

Fatigue of welded joints can occur when poorly made or highly stressed welded joints are subjected to cyclic loading. Welding is a manufacturing method used to join various materials in order to form an assembly. During welding, joints are formed between two or more separate pieces of material which can introduce defects or residual stresses. Under cyclic loading these defects can grow a fatigue crack, causing the assembly to fail even if these cyclic stresses are low and smaller than the base material and weld filler material yield stress. Hence, the fatigue strength of a welded joint does not correlate to the fatigue strength of the base material. Incorporating design considerations in the development phase can reduce failures due to fatigue in welded joints.

== Stress-Life method ==
Typical S-N Curve

Similar to high cycle fatigue analysis, the stress life method utilizing stress-cycle curves (also known as Wöhler curves) can be used to determine the strength of a welded joint under fatigue loading. Welded sample specimens undergo repeated loading at a specified stress amplitude, or fatigue strength, until the material fails. This same test is then repeated with various stress amplitudes in order to determine its corresponding cycles, N, to failure. With the data collected, fatigue strength can be plotted against the corresponding number of cycles for a specific material, welded joint and loading. From these curves, the endurance limit, finite-life and infinite-life region can then be determined.

== Factors affecting fatigue ==
=== Welding residual stresses ===
During the welding process, residual stresses can present themselves in the area of the weld, either in the heat affected zone or fusion zone. The mean stress a welded joint may see in application, can be altered due to the welding processes implementing residual stresses, changing the fatigue life and can render S-N laboratory testing results. Welded assemblies, with geometrical imperfections, can also introduce residual stresses. Although there are stress and strain relief methods to reduce residual stresses, the complete removal of residual stress is not possible.

=== Member thickness ===
An increase in thickness of a base material decreases the fatigue strength when a crack propagates from the toe of a welded joint. This is due to an increase in residual stress concentrations in thick material cross sections.

=== Material type ===
In welded joints, an increase in the base material's ultimate tensile strength does not necessarily lead to an increase in fatigue strength of the welded joint.

=== Welding process ===
Many welding processes are available for various applications and environments. Stress-cycle curves are not available for all of these processes and still need to be developed so proper fatigue analysis can be performed. The most abundant process found in stress-cycle curves is developed from specimens prepared by arc welding.

=== Surrounding environment ===
The surrounding environment of a welded assembly can affect the fatigue life of the welded joints, often lowering them. Variables such as temperature, moisture, and geographical location are considered part of the surrounding environment. Environments which contain sea water may see decreased fatigue life due to the increase in crack growth rates. Little information is available in this area, but it is known that if a base material is subjected to corrosion, the fatigue strength can decrease compared to similar welded joints.

== Avoiding fatigue failures of a welded joint ==
Since the presence of cracks reduces fatigue life and accelerates failure, it is important to avoid all cracking mechanisms in order to prolong the fatigue life of a welded joint. Other weld defects, such as inclusions and lack of penetration, should also be avoided due to these defects being the source of where cracks can initiate. Detailed review of the welded joint during the design is another way to reduce failures. Ensuring that the design is able to handle the cyclic loading profile will prevent premature failures. Additional resources through design handbooks are also available to aid in designing the welded joint to optimize fatigue life. Finite element analysis can also be used to successfully predict fatigue failure.
