= Basquin's law =

Principle of materials science

Image of a typical S-N Curve

Basquin's law of fatigue states that the lifetime of the system has a power-law dependence on the external load amplitude, $t_{f} \sim \sigma_0^{-\alpha}$, where the exponent $\alpha$ has a strong material dependence. It is useful in expressing S-N relationships.

It is a fundamental principle in materials science that describes the relationship between the stress amplitude experienced by a material and its fatigue life under cyclic loading conditions. The law is named after American scientist O. H. Basquin, who introduced the law in 1910. The law provides a mathematical model to predict the number of cycles to failure (N) based on the applied stress amplitude $(\sigma_a)$.

A High Cycle Fatigue Test is used to determine material behaviour under repetitive cyclic loads. This test aims to establish the stress-cycles-to-failure characteristics of materials, primarily utilising an identified stress range and load application frequency. It is usually performed using a standard fatigue testing machine where the test specimen is prepared in a specifically defined manner and then subjected to loads until failure takes place. Throughout the test, computer software is used to record various necessary parameters such as the number of cycles experienced and the exact point of failure. This testing protocol enables the development of an S-N curve (also known as a Wöhler curve), a graphical representation of stress amplitude (S) versus the number of cycles to failure (N). By plotting these curves for different materials, engineers can compare them and make informed decisions on the optimal material selection for specific engineering applications. The S-N relationship can generally be expressed by the Basquin's law of fatigue, which is given by:

$\sigma_a = \sigma'_f \left ( \frac{2N}{\varepsilon'_F} \right )^b$,

where $\sigma_a$ is the stress amplitude, $\sigma'_f$ is the fatigue strength coefficient, $N$ is the number of cycles to failure, $\varepsilon'_F$ is the fatigue ductility coefficient, and $b$ is the fatigue strength exponent. Both $\sigma'_f$ and $b$ are properties of the material.

Basquin's Law can also be expressed as $\left ( \frac{\Delta\sigma}{2} \right )(N_{f}^b) = C$, where $\Delta\sigma$ is the change in stress, $N_f$ is the number of cycles to failure, and both $b$ and $C$ are constants.
