= Widespread fatigue damage =

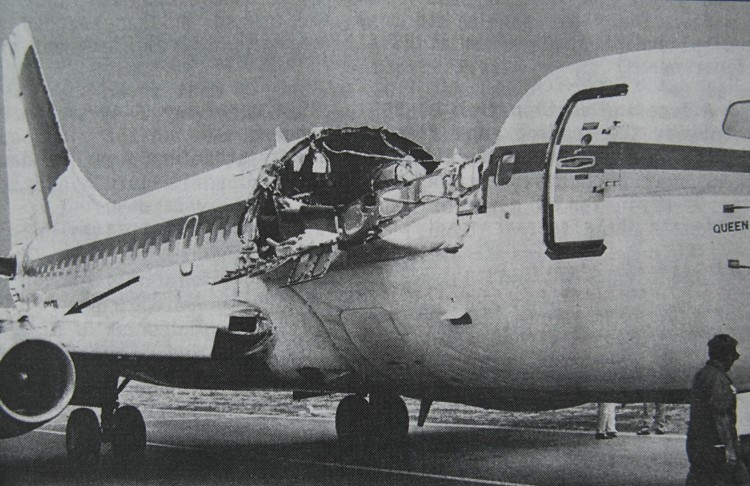
Widespread fatigue caused the in-flight failure of the fuselage on Aloha Airlines Flight 243

Widespread fatigue damage (WFD) in a structure is characterised by the simultaneous presence of fatigue cracks at multiple points that are of sufficient size and density that while individually they may be acceptable, link-up of the cracks could suddenly occur and the structure could fail. For example, small fatigue cracks developing along a row of fastener holes can coalesce increasing the stress on adjacent cracked sites increasing the rate of growth of those cracks. The objective of a designer is to determine when large numbers of small cracks could degrade the joint strength to an unacceptable level. The in-flight loss of part of the fuselage from Aloha Airlines Flight 243 was attributed to multi-site fatigue damage.

== Categories of WFD ==
Several factors can influence the occurrence of WFD, like design issues and probabilistic parameters like manufacturing, environment etc. Two categories of WFD are:

=== Multi-Site Damage (MSD) ===
MSD is the simultaneous presence of fatigue cracks in the same structural element.

=== Multi-Element Damage (MED) ===
MED is the simultaneous presence of fatigue cracks in similar adjacent structural elements.

== Difficulty in determining WFD occurrence ==
Main difficulties involved are:

- Cracks associated with MSD and MED are so small initially that they cannot be detected with existing inspection methods.
- Fatigue cracks related to WFD grow rapidly. Therefore operators are not able to detect the cracks before they cause structural failure.

== Rule to predict the occurrence of WFD ==
First, a parameter called Limits Of Validity (LOV) is defined. LOV is defined as “the period of time (in flight cycles, hours or both) up to which WFD will not occur in aeroplane structure.”

The steps followed are:

- Evaluation of structural configurations and determination of LOV based on fatigue test evidence.
- Provide warnings to preclude the development of WFD up to LOV.
- Adopt LOV values as a criterion to determine the life of aeroplane.
- Stop the operation of aeroplanes when LOV is reached.
