= Fatigue (material) =

Initiation and propagation of cracks in a material due to cyclic loading

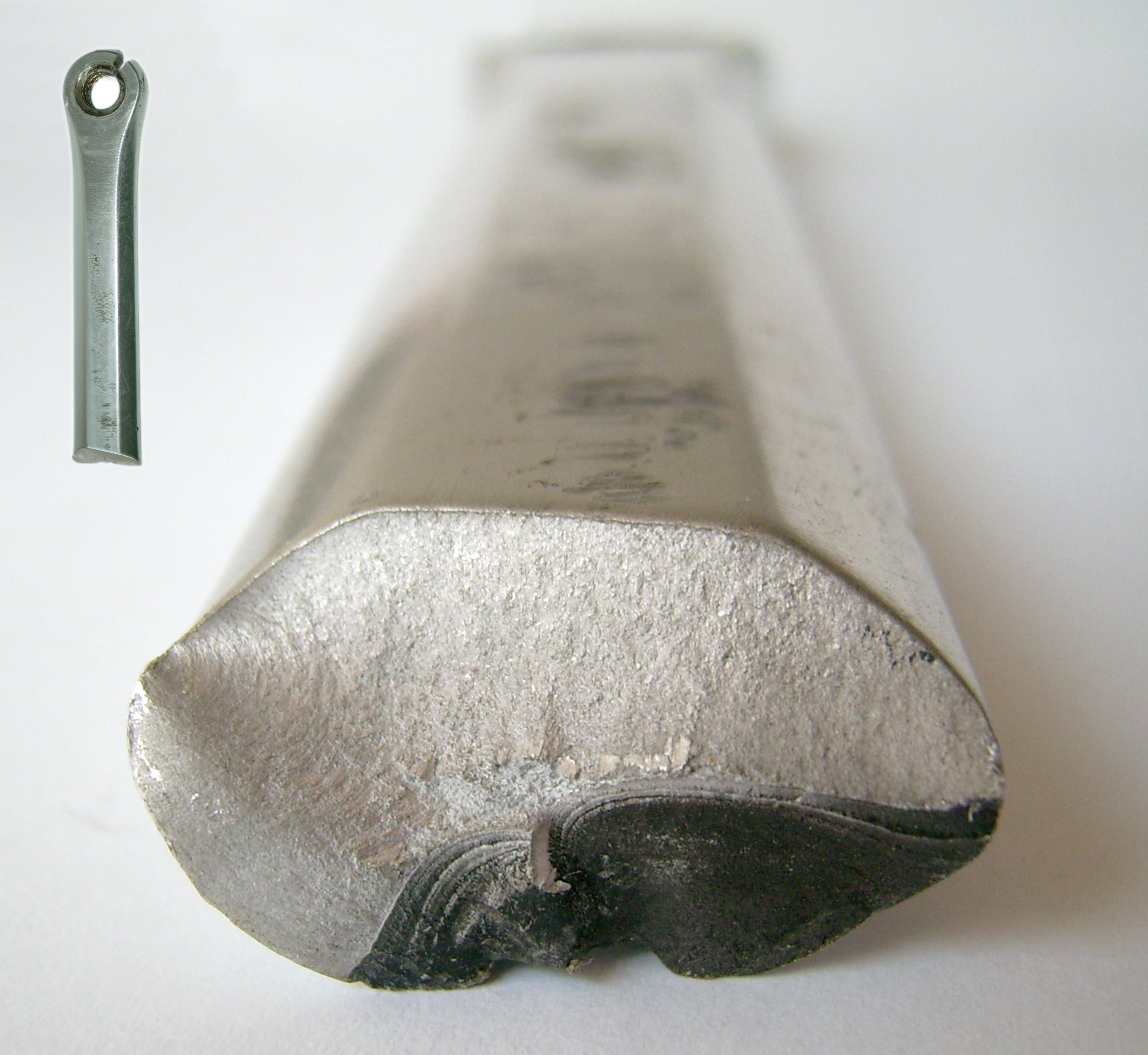
Fracture surface of an aluminium crank arm from a bicycle. The dark area (due to oil, dirt and fretting) is a slow growth fatigue crack and may contain striations. The bright area is caused by sudden fracture.

In materials science, fatigue is the initiation and propagation of cracks in a material due to cyclic loading. Once a fatigue crack has initiated, it grows a small amount with each loading cycle, typically producing striations on some parts of the fracture surface. The crack will continue to grow until it reaches a critical size, which occurs when the stress intensity factor of the crack exceeds the fracture toughness of the material, producing rapid propagation and typically complete fracture of the structure.

Fatigue has traditionally been associated with the failure of metal components which led to the term metal fatigue. In the nineteenth century, the sudden failing of metal railway axles was thought to be caused by the metal crystallising because of the brittle appearance of the fracture surface, but this has since been disproved. Most materials, such as composites, plastics and ceramics, seem to experience some sort of fatigue-related failure.

To aid in predicting the fatigue life of a component, fatigue tests are carried out using coupons to measure the rate of crack growth by applying constant amplitude cyclic loading and averaging the measured growth of a crack over thousands of cycles. There are also special cases that need to be considered where the rate of crack growth is significantly different compared to that obtained from constant amplitude testing, such as the reduced rate of growth that occurs for small loads near the threshold or after the application of an overload, and the increased rate of crack growth associated with short cracks or after the application of an underload.

If the loads are above a certain threshold, microscopic cracks will begin to initiate at stress concentrations such as holes, persistent slip bands (PSBs), composite interfaces or grain boundaries in metals. The stress values that cause fatigue damage are typically much less than the yield strength of the material.

== Stages of fatigue ==
Historically, fatigue has been separated into regions of high cycle fatigue that require more than 10^{4} cycles to failure where stress is low and primarily elastic and low cycle fatigue where there is significant plasticity. Experiments have shown that low cycle fatigue is also crack growth.

Fatigue failures, both for high and low cycles, all follow the same basic steps: crack initiation, crack growth stages I and II, and finally ultimate failure. To begin the process, cracks must nucleate within a material. This process can occur either at stress risers in metallic samples or at areas with a high void density in polymer samples. These cracks propagate slowly at first during stage I crack growth along crystallographic planes, where shear stresses are highest. Once the cracks reach a critical size they propagate quickly during stage II crack growth in a direction perpendicular to the applied force. These cracks can eventually lead to the ultimate failure of the material, often in a brittle catastrophic fashion.

=== Crack initiation ===
The formation of initial cracks preceding fatigue failure is a separate process consisting of four discrete steps in metallic samples. The material will develop cell structures and harden in response to the applied load. This causes the amplitude of the applied stress to increase given the new restraints on strain. These newly formed cell structures will eventually break down with the formation of persistent slip bands (PSBs). Slip in the material is localized at these PSBs, and the exaggerated slip can now serve as a stress concentrator for a crack to form. Nucleation and growth of a crack to a detectable size accounts for most of the cracking process. It is for this reason that cyclic fatigue failures seem to occur so suddenly where the bulk of the changes in the material are not visible without destructive testing. Even in normally ductile materials, fatigue failures will resemble sudden brittle failures.

PSB-induced slip planes result in intrusions and extrusions along the surface of a material, often occurring in pairs. This slip is not a microstructural change within the material, but rather a propagation of dislocations within the material. Instead of a smooth interface, the intrusions and extrusions will cause the surface of the material to resemble the edge of a deck of cards, where not all cards are perfectly aligned. Slip-induced intrusions and extrusions create extremely fine surface structures on the material. With surface structure size inversely related to stress concentration factors, PSB-induced surface slip can cause fractures to initiate.

These steps can also be bypassed entirely if the cracks form at a pre-existing stress concentrator such as from an inclusion in the material or from a geometric stress concentrator caused by a sharp internal corner or fillet.

=== Crack growth ===
Most of the fatigue life is generally consumed in the crack growth phase. The rate of growth is primarily driven by the range of cyclic loading although additional factors such as mean stress, environment, overloads and underloads can also affect the rate of growth. Crack growth may stop if the loads are small enough to fall below a critical threshold.

Fatigue cracks can grow from material or manufacturing defects from as small as 10 μm.

When the rate of growth becomes large enough, fatigue striations can be seen on the fracture surface. Striations mark the position of the crack tip and the width of each striation represents the growth from one loading cycle. Striations are a result of plasticity at the crack tip.

When the stress intensity exceeds a critical value known as the fracture toughness, unsustainable fast fracture will occur, usually by a process of microvoid coalescence. Prior to final fracture, the fracture surface may contain a mixture of areas of fatigue and fast fracture.

==== Acceleration and retardation ====
The following effects change the rate of growth:

- Mean stress effect: Higher mean stress increases the rate of crack growth.
- Environment: Increased moisture increases the rate of crack growth. In the case of aluminium, cracks generally grow from the surface, where water vapour from the atmosphere is able to reach the tip of the crack and dissociate into atomic hydrogen which causes hydrogen embrittlement. Cracks growing internally are isolated from the atmosphere and grow in a vacuum where the rate of growth is typically an order of magnitude slower than a surface crack.
- Short crack effect: In 1975, Pearson observed that short cracks grow faster than expected. Possible reasons for the short crack effect include the presence of the T-stress, the tri-axial stress state at the crack tip, the lack of crack closure associated with short cracks and the large plastic zone in comparison to the crack length. In addition, long cracks typically experience a threshold which short cracks do not have. There are a number of criteria for short cracks:
  - cracks are typically smaller than 1 mm,
  - cracks are smaller than the material microstructure size such as the grain size, or
  - crack length is small compared to the plastic zone.
- Underloads: Small numbers of underloads increase the rate of growth and may counteract the effect of overloads.
- Overloads: Initially overloads (> 1.5 the maximum load in a sequence) lead to a small increase in the rate of growth followed by a long reduction in the rate of growth.

== Characteristics of fatigue ==
- In metal alloys, and for the simplifying case when there are no macroscopic or microscopic discontinuities, the process starts with dislocation movements at the microscopic level, which eventually form persistent slip bands that become the nucleus of short cracks.
- Macroscopic and microscopic discontinuities (at the crystalline grain scale) as well as component design features which cause stress concentrations (holes, keyways, sharp changes of load direction etc.) are common locations at which the fatigue process begins.
- Fatigue is a process that has a degree of randomness (stochastic), often showing considerable scatter even in seemingly identical samples in well controlled environments.
- Fatigue is usually associated with tensile stresses but fatigue cracks have been reported due to compressive loads.
- The greater the applied stress range, the shorter the life.
- Fatigue life scatter tends to increase for longer fatigue lives.
- Damage is irreversible. Materials do not recover when rested.
- Fatigue life is influenced by a variety of factors, such as temperature, surface finish, metallurgical microstructure, presence of oxidizing or inert chemicals, residual stresses, scuffing contact (fretting), etc.
- Some materials (e.g., some steel and titanium alloys) exhibit a theoretical fatigue limit below which continued loading does not lead to fatigue failure.
- High cycle fatigue strength (about 10^{4} to 10^{8} cycles) can be described by stress-based parameters. A load-controlled servo-hydraulic test rig is commonly used in these tests, with frequencies of around 20–50 Hz. Other sorts of machines—like resonant magnetic machines—can also be used, to achieve frequencies up to 250 Hz.
- Low-cycle fatigue (loading that typically causes failure in less than 10^{4} cycles) is associated with localized plastic behavior in metals; thus, a strain-based parameter should be used for fatigue life prediction in metals. Testing is conducted with constant strain amplitudes typically at 0.01–5 Hz.

== Timeline of research history ==
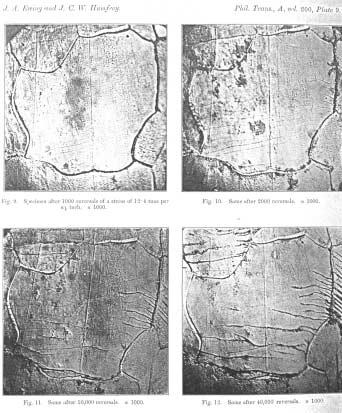
Micrographs showing how surface fatigue cracks grow as material is further cycled. From Ewing & Humfrey, 1903

- 1837: Wilhelm Albert publishes the first article on fatigue. He devised a test machine for conveyor chains used in the Clausthal mines.
- 1839: Jean-Victor Poncelet describes metals as being 'tired' in his lectures at the military school at Metz.
- 1842: William John Macquorn Rankine recognises the importance of stress concentrations in his investigation of railroad axle failures. The Versailles rail accident was caused by fatigue failure of a locomotive axle.
- 1843: Joseph Glynn reports on the fatigue of an axle on a locomotive tender. He identifies the keyway as the crack origin.
- 1848: The Railway Inspectorate reports one of the first tyre failures, probably from a rivet hole in tread of railway carriage wheel. It was likely a fatigue failure.
- 1849: Eaton Hodgkinson is granted a "small sum of money" to report to the UK Parliament on his work in "ascertaining by direct experiment, the effects of continued changes of load upon iron structures and to what extent they could be loaded without danger to their ultimate security".
- 1854: F. Braithwaite reports on common service fatigue failures and coins the term fatigue.
- 1860: Systematic fatigue testing undertaken by Sir William Fairbairn and August Wöhler.
- 1870: A. Wöhler summarises his work on railroad axles. He concludes that cyclic stress range is more important than peak stress and introduces the concept of endurance limit.
- 1903: Sir James Alfred Ewing demonstrates the origin of fatigue failure in microscopic cracks.
- 1910: O. H. Basquin proposes a log-log relationship for S-N curves, using Wöhler's test data.
- 1940: Sidney M. Cadwell publishes first rigorous study of fatigue in rubber.
- 1945: A. M. Miner popularises Palmgren's (1924) linear damage hypothesis as a practical design tool.
- 1952: W. Weibull An S-N curve model.
- 1954: The world's first commercial jetliner, the de Havilland Comet, suffers disaster as three planes break up in mid-air, causing de Havilland and all other manufacturers to redesign high altitude aircraft and in particular replace square apertures like windows with oval ones.
- 1954: L. F. Coffin and S. S. Manson explain fatigue crack-growth in terms of plastic strain in the tip of cracks.
- 1961: P. C. Paris proposes methods for predicting the rate of growth of individual fatigue cracks in the face of initial scepticism and popular defence of Miner's phenomenological approach.
- 1968: Tatsuo Endo and M. Matsuishi devise the rainflow-counting algorithm and enable the reliable application of Miner's rule to random loadings.
- 1970: Smith, Watson, and Topper developed a mean stress correction model, where the fatigue damage in a cycle is determined by the product of the maximum stress and strain amplitude.
- 1970: W. Elber elucidates the mechanisms and importance of crack closure in slowing the growth of a fatigue crack due to the wedging effect of plastic deformation left behind the tip of the crack.
- 1973: M. W. Brown and K. J. Miller observe that fatigue life under multiaxial conditions is governed by the experience of the plane receiving the most damage, and that both tension and shear loads on the critical plane must be considered.

== Predicting fatigue life ==
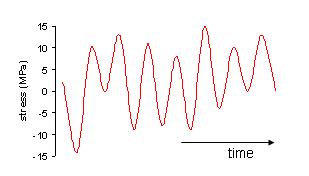
Spectrum loading

The American Society for Testing and Materials defines fatigue life, N_{f}, as the number of stress cycles of a specified character that a specimen sustains before failure of a specified nature occurs. For some materials, like steel and titanium, there is a theoretical value for stress amplitude below which the material will not fail for any number of cycles, called a fatigue limit or endurance limit. In practice, several bodies of work done at greater numbers of cycles suggest that fatigue limits do not exist for any metals.

Engineers have used a number of methods to determine the fatigue life of a material:

1. the stress-life method,
2. the strain-life method,
3. the crack growth method and
4. probabilistic methods, which can be based on either life or crack growth methods.

Whether using stress/strain-life approach or using crack growth approach, complex or variable amplitude loading is reduced to a series of fatigue equivalent simple cyclic loadings using a technique such as the rainflow-counting algorithm.

=== Stress-life and strain-life methods ===
A mechanical part is often exposed to a complex, often random, sequence of loads, large and small. In order to assess the safe life of such a part using the fatigue damage or stress/strain-life methods the following series of steps is usually performed:

1. Complex loading is reduced to a series of simple cyclic loadings using a technique such as rainflow analysis;
2. A histogram of cyclic stress is created from the rainflow analysis to form a fatigue damage spectrum;
3. For each stress level, the degree of cumulative damage is calculated from the S-N curve; and
4. The effect of the individual contributions are combined using an algorithm such as Miner's rule.

Since S-N curves are typically generated for uniaxial loading, some equivalence rule is needed whenever the loading is multiaxial. For simple, proportional loading histories (lateral load in a constant ratio with the axial), Sines rule may be applied. For more complex situations, such as non-proportional loading, critical plane analysis must be applied.

==== Miner's rule ====
In 1945, Milton A. Miner popularised a rule that had first been proposed by Arvid Palmgren in 1924. The rule, variously called Miner's rule or the Palmgren–Miner linear damage hypothesis, states that where there are k different stress magnitudes in a spectrum, S_{i} (1 ≤ i ≤ k), each contributing n_{i}(S_{i}) cycles, then if N_{i}(S_{i}) is the number of cycles to failure of a constant stress reversal S_{i} (determined by uni-axial fatigue tests), failure occurs when:

$$\sum_{i=1}^k \frac {n_i} {N_i}=C$$

Usually, for design purposes, C is assumed to be 1. This can be thought of as assessing what proportion of life is consumed by a linear combination of stress reversals at varying magnitudes.

Although Miner's rule may be a useful approximation in many circumstances, it has several major limitations:

1. It fails to recognize the probabilistic nature of fatigue and there is no simple way to relate life predicted by the rule with the characteristics of a probability distribution. Industry analysts often use design curves, adjusted to account for scatter, to calculate N_{i}(S_{i}).
2. The sequence in which high vs. low stress cycles are applied to a sample in fact affect the fatigue life, for which Miner's Rule does not account. In some circumstances, cycles of low stress followed by high stress cause more damage than would be predicted by the rule. It does not consider the effect of an overload or high stress which may result in a compressive residual stress that may retard crack growth. High stress followed by low stress may have less damage due to the presence of compressive residual stress (or localized plastic damages around crack tip).

==== Stress-life (S-N) method ====
S-N curve for a brittle aluminium with an ultimate tensile strength of 320 MPa

Materials fatigue performance is commonly characterized by an S-N curve, also known as a Wöhler curve. This is often plotted with the cyclic stress (S) against the cycles to failure (N) on a logarithmic scale. S-N curves are derived from tests on samples of the material to be characterized (often called coupons or specimens) where a regular sinusoidal stress is applied by a testing machine which also counts the number of cycles to failure. This process is sometimes known as coupon testing. For greater accuracy but lower generality component testing is used. Each coupon or component test generates a point on the plot though in some cases there is a runout where the time to failure exceeds that available for the test (see censoring). Analysis of fatigue data requires techniques from statistics, especially survival analysis, linear regression and extreme value analysis.

The progression of the S-N curve can be influenced by many factors such as stress ratio (mean stress), loading frequency, temperature, corrosion, residual stresses, and the presence of notches. A constant fatigue life (CFL) diagram is useful for the study of stress ratio effect. The Goodman line is a method used to estimate the influence of the mean stress on the fatigue strength.

A Constant Fatigue Life (CFL) diagram is useful for stress ratio effect on S-N curve. Also, in the presence of a steady stress superimposed on the cyclic loading, the Goodman relation can be used to estimate a failure condition. It plots stress amplitude against mean stress with the fatigue limit and the ultimate tensile strength of the material as the two extremes. Alternative failure criteria include Soderberg and Gerber.

As coupons sampled from a homogeneous frame will display a variation in their number of cycles to failure, the S-N curve should more properly be a Stress-Cycle-Probability (S-N-P) curve to capture the probability of failure after a given number of cycles of a certain stress.

With body-centered cubic materials (bcc), the Wöhler curve often becomes a horizontal line with decreasing stress amplitude, i.e. there is a fatigue strength that can be assigned to these materials. With face-centered cubic metals (fcc), the Wöhler curve generally drops continuously, so that only a fatigue limit can be assigned to these materials.

==== Strain-life (ε-N) method ====
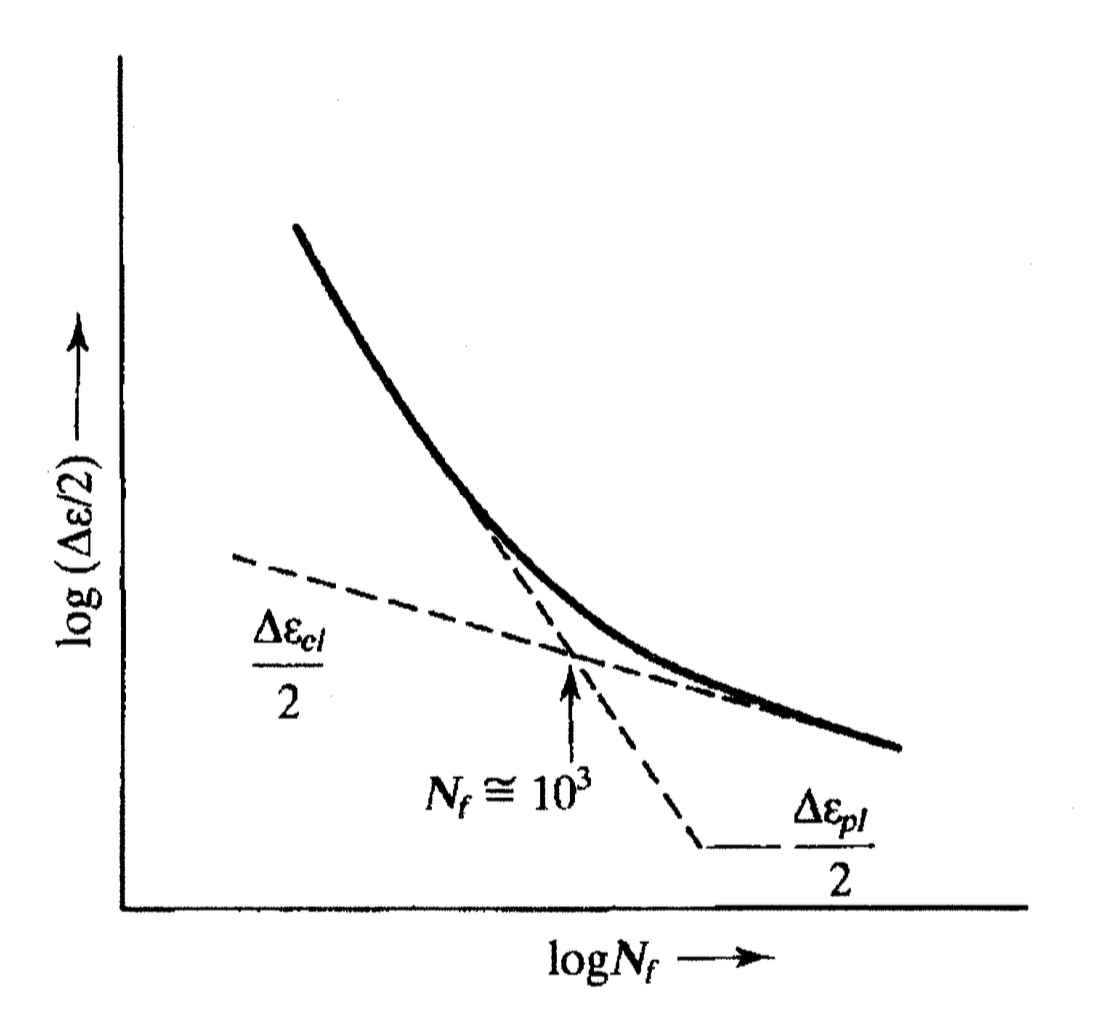
Graph showing fatigue failure as a function of strain amplitude.

When strains are no longer elastic, such as in the presence of stress concentrations, the total strain can be used instead of stress as a similitude parameter. This is known as the strain-life method. The total strain amplitude $\Delta \varepsilon /2$ is the sum of the elastic strain amplitude $\Delta \varepsilon_\text{e} / 2$ and the plastic strain amplitude $\Delta \varepsilon_\text{p} / 2$ and is given by

$${\Delta \varepsilon \over 2} = {\Delta \varepsilon_\text{e} \over 2} + {\Delta \varepsilon_\text{p} \over 2}$$.

Basquin's equation for the elastic strain amplitude is

$${\Delta \varepsilon_\text{e} \over 2} = \frac{\Delta \sigma}{2E} = \frac{\sigma_\text{a}}{E}$$

where $E$ is Young's modulus.

The relation for high cycle fatigue can be expressed using the elastic strain amplitude

$${\Delta \varepsilon_\text{e} \over 2} = \frac{\sigma^\prime_\text{f}}{E} (2N_\text{f})^b$$

where $\sigma^\prime_\text{f}$ is a parameter that scales with tensile strength obtained by fitting experimental data, $N_\text{f}$ is the number of cycles to failure and $b$ is the slope of the log-log curve again determined by curve fitting.

In 1954, Coffin and Manson proposed that the fatigue life of a component was related to the plastic strain amplitude using

$${\Delta \varepsilon_\text{p} \over 2} = \varepsilon^\prime_\text{f}(2N_\text{f})^c$$.

Combining the elastic and plastic portions gives the total strain amplitude accounting for both low and high cycle fatigue

$${\Delta \varepsilon \over 2} = \frac{\sigma^\prime_\text{f}}{E} (2N_\text{f})^b + \varepsilon^\prime_\text{f}(2N_\text{f})^c$$.

where $\sigma_f'$ is the fatigue strength coefficient, $b$ is the fatigue strength exponent, $\varepsilon_f'$ is the fatigue ductility coefficient, $c$ is the fatigue ductility exponent, and $N_f$ is the number of cycles to failure ($2N_f$ being the number of reversals to failure).

=== Crack growth methods ===
An estimate of the fatigue life of a component can be made using a crack growth equation by summing up the width of each increment of crack growth for each loading cycle. Safety or scatter factors are applied to the calculated life to account for any uncertainty and variability associated with fatigue. The rate of growth used in crack growth predictions is typically measured by applying thousands of constant amplitude cycles to a coupon and measuring the rate of growth from the change in compliance of the coupon or by measuring the growth of the crack on the surface of the coupon. Standard methods for measuring the rate of growth have been developed by ASTM International.

Crack growth equations such as the Paris–Erdoğan equation are used to predict the life of a component. They can be used to predict the growth of a crack from 10 um to failure. For normal manufacturing finishes this may cover most of the fatigue life of a component where growth can start from the first cycle. The conditions at the crack tip of a component are usually related to the conditions of test coupon using a characterising parameter such as the stress intensity, J-integral or crack tip opening displacement. All these techniques aim to match the crack tip conditions on the component to that of test coupons which give the rate of crack growth.

Additional models may be necessary to include retardation and acceleration effects associated with overloads or underloads in the loading sequence. In addition, small crack growth data may be needed to match the increased rate of growth seen with small cracks.

Typically, a cycle counting technique such as rainflow-cycle counting is used to extract the cycles from a complex sequence. This technique, along with others, has been shown to work with crack growth methods.

Crack growth methods have the advantage that they can predict the intermediate size of cracks. This information can be used to schedule inspections on a structure to ensure safety whereas strain/life methods only give a life until failure.

== Dealing with fatigue ==
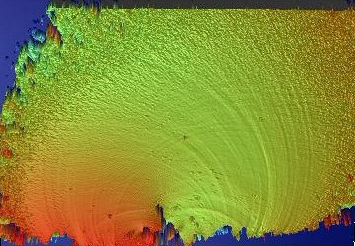
Fracture surface in a glass rod showing beach marks surrounding the initiation site.

=== Design ===
Dependable design against fatigue-failure requires thorough education and supervised experience in structural engineering, mechanical engineering, or materials science. There are at least five principal approaches to life assurance for mechanical parts that display increasing degrees of sophistication:

1. Design to keep stress below threshold of fatigue limit (infinite lifetime concept);
2. Fail-safe, graceful degradation, and fault-tolerant design: Instruct the user to replace parts when they fail. Design in such a way that there is no single point of failure, and so that when any one part completely fails, it does not lead to catastrophic failure of the entire system.
3. Safe-life design: Design (conservatively) for a fixed life after which the user is instructed to replace the part with a new one (a lifed part, finite lifetime concept, or "safe-life" design practice); planned obsolescence and disposable product are variants that design for a fixed life after which the user is instructed to replace the entire device;
4. Damage tolerance: Is an approach that ensures aircraft safety by assuming the presence of cracks or defects even in new aircraft. Crack growth calculations, periodic inspections and component repair or replacement can be used to ensure critical components that may contain cracks, remain safe. Inspections usually use nondestructive testing to limit or monitor the size of possible cracks and require an accurate prediction of the rate of crack-growth between inspections. The designer sets some aircraft maintenance checks schedule frequent enough that parts are replaced while the crack is still in the "slow growth" phase. This is often referred to as damage tolerant design or "retirement-for-cause".
5. Risk Management: Ensures the probability of failure remains below an acceptable level. This approach is typically used for aircraft where acceptable levels may be based on probability of failure during a single flight or taken over the lifetime of an aircraft. A component is assumed to have a crack with a probability distribution of crack sizes. This approach can consider variability in values such as crack growth rates, usage and critical crack size. It is also useful for considering damage at multiple locations that may interact to produce multi-site or widespread fatigue damage. Probability distributions that are common in data analysis and in design against fatigue include the log-normal distribution, extreme value distribution, Birnbaum–Saunders distribution, and Weibull distribution.

=== Testing ===
Fatigue testing can be used for components such as a coupon or a full-scale test article to determine:

1. the rate of crack growth and fatigue life of components such as a coupon or a full-scale test article.
2. location of critical regions
3. degree of fail-safety when part of the structure fails
4. the origin and cause of the crack initiating defect from fractographic examination of the crack.

These tests may form part of the certification process such as for airworthiness certification.

=== Repair ===
1. Stop drill. Fatigue cracks that have begun to propagate can sometimes be stopped by drilling holes, called drill stops, at the tip of the crack. The possibility remains of a new crack starting in the side of the hole.
2. Blend. Small cracks can be blended away and the surface cold worked or shot peened.
3. Oversize holes. Holes with cracks growing from them can be drilled out to a larger hole to remove cracking and bushed to restore the original hole. Bushes can be cold shrink interference fit bushes to induce beneficial compressive residual stresses. The oversized hole can also be cold worked by drawing an oversized mandrel through the hole.
4. Patch. Cracks may be repaired by installing a patch or repair fitting. Composite patches have been used to restore the strength of aircraft wings after cracks have been detected or to lower the stress prior to cracking in order to improve the fatigue life. Patches may restrict the ability to monitor fatigue cracks and may need to be removed and replaced for inspections.

=== Life improvement ===
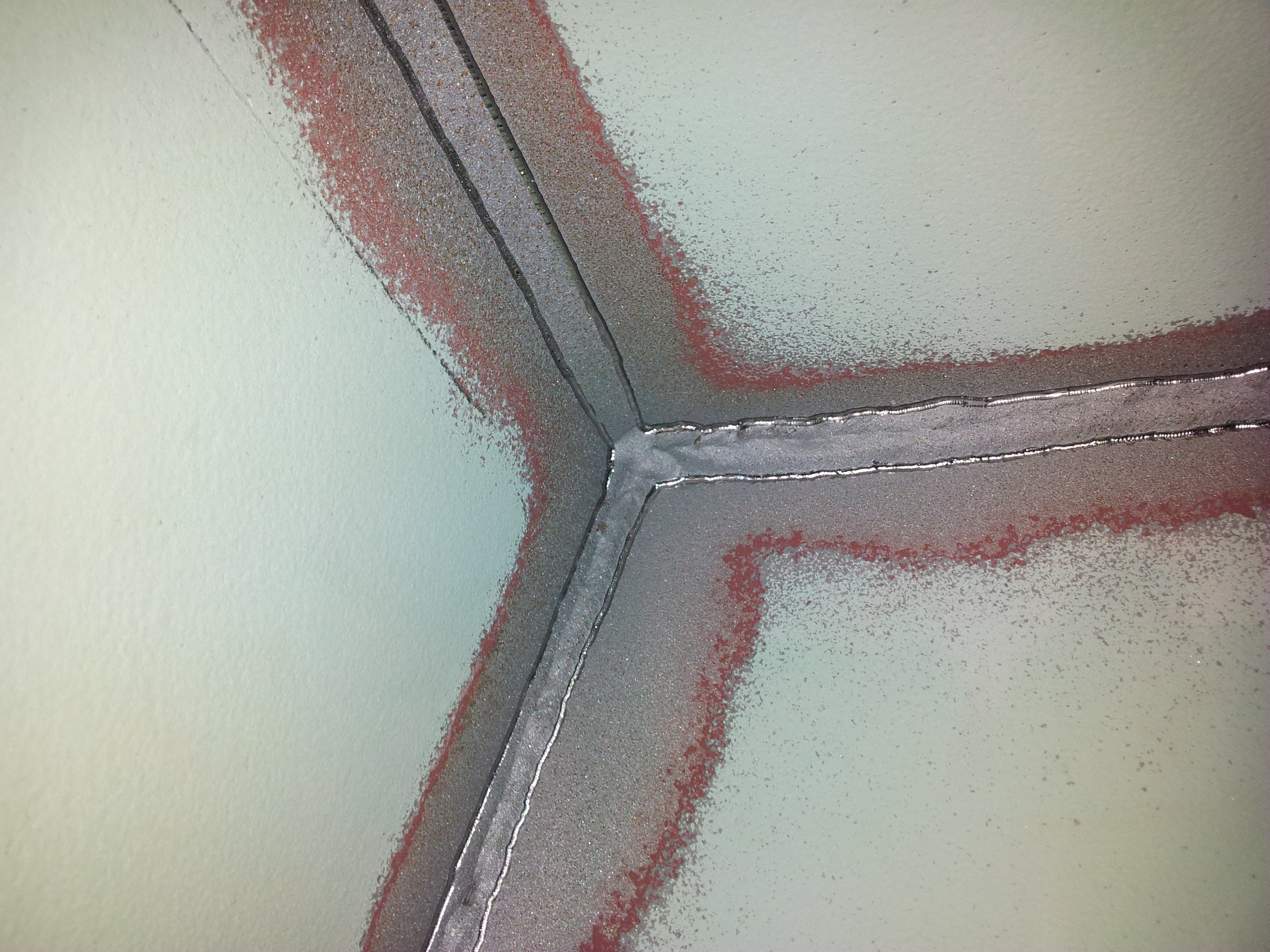
Example of a HFMI treated steel highway bridge to avoid fatigue along the weld transition

1. Change material. Changes in the materials used in parts can also improve fatigue life. For example, parts can be made from better fatigue rated metals. Complete replacement and redesign of parts can also reduce if not eliminate fatigue problems. Thus helicopter rotor blades and propellers in metal are being replaced by composite equivalents. They are not only lighter, but also much more resistant to fatigue. They are more expensive, but the extra cost is amply repaid by their greater integrity, since loss of a rotor blade usually leads to total loss of the aircraft. A similar argument has been made for replacement of metal fuselages, wings and tails of aircraft.
2. Induce residual stresses. Peening a surface can reduce such tensile stresses and create compressive residual stress, which prevents crack initiation. Forms of peening include: shot peening, using high-speed projectiles, high-frequency impact treatment (also called high-frequency mechanical impact) using a mechanical hammer, and laser peening which uses high-energy laser pulses. Low plasticity burnishing can also be used to induce compresses stress in fillets and cold work mandrels can be used for holes. Increases in fatigue life and strength are proportionally related to the depth of the compressive residual stresses imparted. Shot peening imparts compressive residual stresses approximately 0.005 inches (0.1 mm) deep, while laser peening can go 0.040 to 0.100 inches (1 to 2.5 mm) deep, or deeper.
3. Deep cryogenic treatment. The use of deep cryogenic treatment has been shown to increase resistance to fatigue failure. Springs used in industry, auto racing and firearms have been shown to last up to six times longer when treated. Heat checking, which is a form of thermal cyclic fatigue has been greatly delayed.
4. Re-profiling. Changing the shape of a stress concentration such as a hole or cutout may be used to extend the life of a component. Shape optimisation using numerical optimisation algorithms have been used to lower the stress concentration in wings and increase their life.

== Fatigue of composites ==
Composite materials can offer excellent resistance to fatigue loading. In general, composites exhibit good fracture toughness and, unlike metals, increase fracture toughness with increasing strength. The critical damage size in composites is also greater than that for metals.

The primary mode of damage in a metal structure is cracking. For metal, cracks propagate in a relatively well-defined manner with respect to the applied stress, and the critical crack size and rate of crack propagation can be related to specimen data through analytical fracture mechanics. However, with composite structures, there is no single damage mode which dominates. Matrix cracking, delamination, debonding, voids, fiber fracture, and composite cracking can all occur separately and in combination, and the predominance of one or more is highly dependent on the laminate orientations and loading conditions. In addition, the unique joints and attachments used for composite structures often introduce modes of failure different from those typified by the laminate itself.

The composite damage propagates in a less regular manner and damage modes can change. Experience with composites indicates that the rate of damage propagation in does not exhibit the two distinct regions of initiation and propagation like metals. The crack initiation range in metals is propagation, and there is a significant quantitative difference in rate while the difference appears to be less apparent with composites. Fatigue cracks of composites may form in the matrix and propagate slowly since the matrix carries such a small fraction of the applied stress. And the fibers in the wake of the crack experience fatigue damage. In many cases, the damage rate is accelerated by deleterious interactions with the environment like oxidation or corrosion of fibers.

== Notable fatigue failures ==
=== Versailles train crash ===
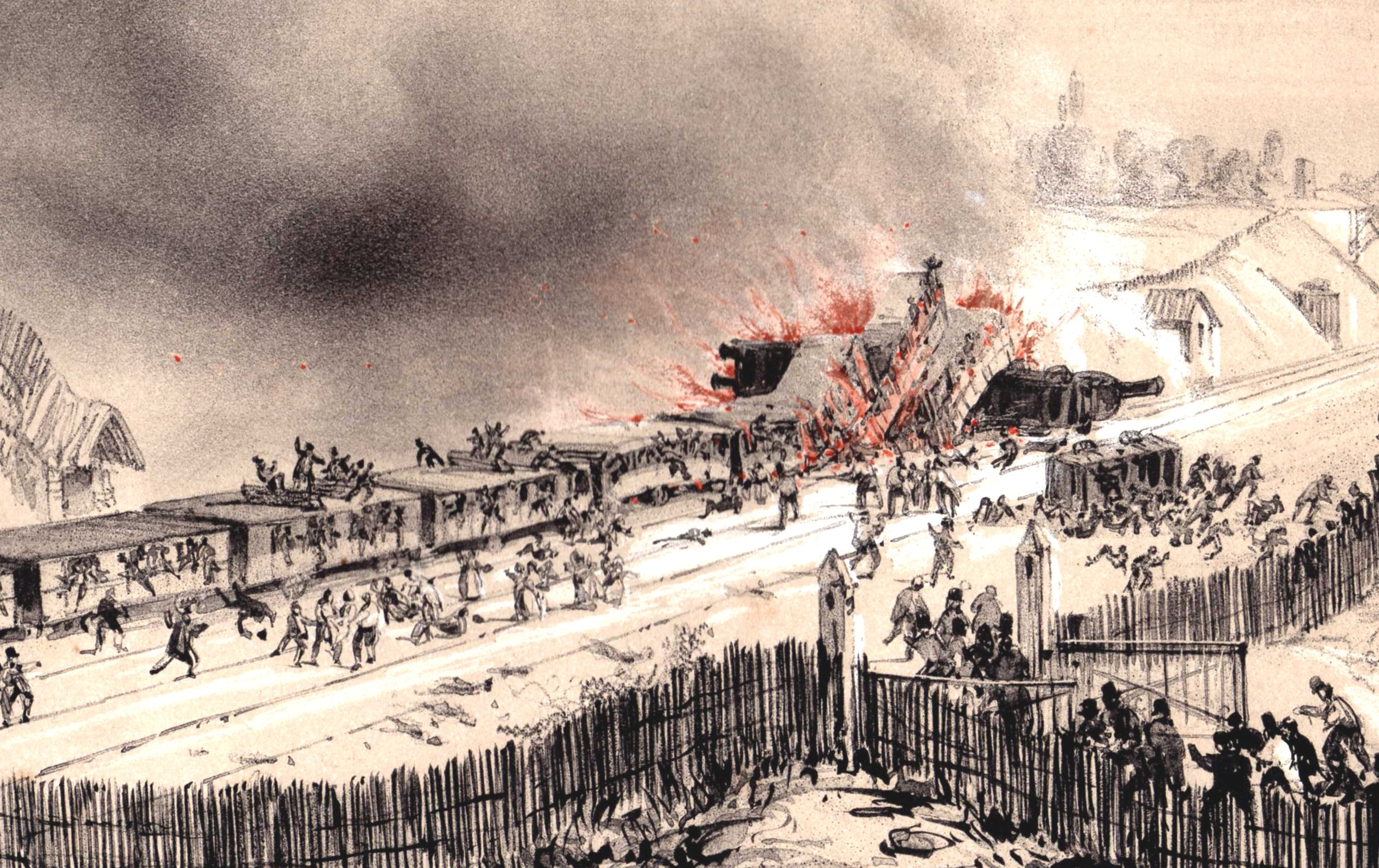
Versailles train disaster

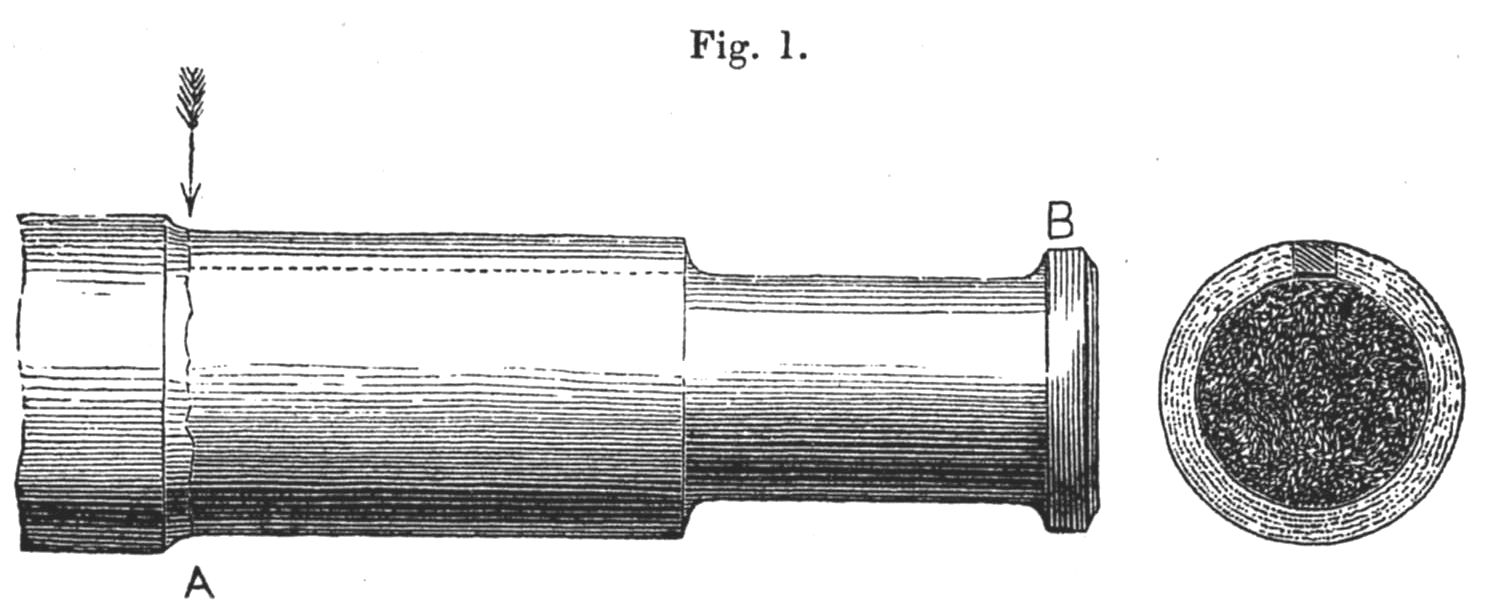
Drawing of a fatigue failure in an axle by Joseph Glynn, 1843

Following King Louis-Philippe I's celebrations at the Palace of Versailles, a train returning to Paris crashed in May 1842 at Meudon after the leading locomotive broke an axle. The carriages behind piled into the wrecked engines and caught fire. At least 55 passengers were killed trapped in the locked carriages, including the explorer Jules Dumont d'Urville. This accident is known in France as the "Catastrophe ferroviaire de Meudon". The accident was witnessed by the British locomotive engineer Joseph Locke and widely reported in Britain. It was discussed extensively by engineers, who sought an explanation.

The derailment had been the result of a broken locomotive axle. Rankine's investigation of broken axles in Britain highlighted the importance of stress concentration, and the mechanism of crack growth with repeated loading. His and other papers suggesting a crack growth mechanism through repeated stressing, however, were ignored, and fatigue failures occurred at an ever-increasing rate on the expanding railway system. Other spurious theories seemed to be more acceptable, such as the idea that the metal had somehow "crystallized". The notion was based on the crystalline appearance of the fast fracture region of the crack's surface, but ignored the fact that the metal was already highly crystalline.

=== de Havilland Comet ===
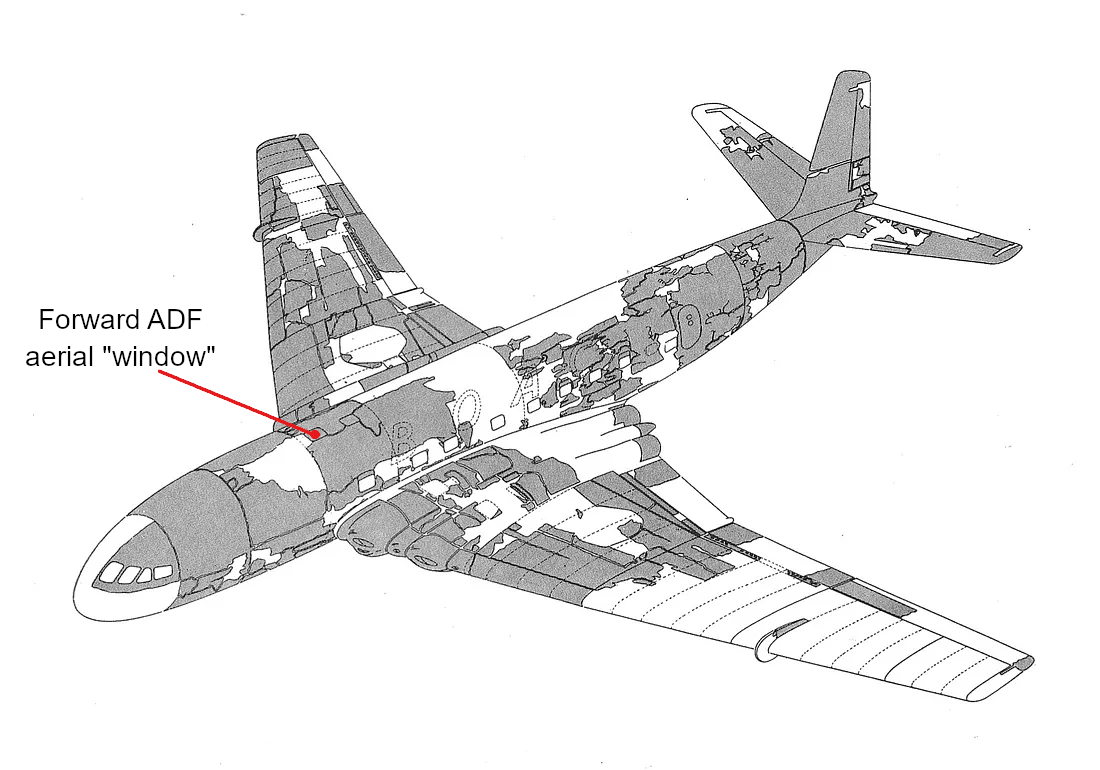
The recovered (shaded) parts of the wreckage of G-ALYP and the site (arrowed) of the failure

Two de Havilland Comet passenger jets broke up in mid-air and crashed within a few months of each other in 1954. As a result, systematic tests were conducted on a fuselage immersed and pressurised in a water tank. After the equivalent of 3,000 flights, investigators at the Royal Aircraft Establishment (RAE) were able to conclude that the crash had been due to failure of the pressure cabin at the forward Automatic Direction Finder window in the roof. This 'window' was in fact one of two apertures for the aerials of an electronic navigation system in which opaque fibreglass panels took the place of the window 'glass'. The failure was a result of metal fatigue caused by the repeated pressurisation and de-pressurisation of the aircraft cabin. Also, the supports around the windows were riveted, not bonded, as the original specifications for the aircraft had called for. The problem was exacerbated by the punch rivet construction technique employed. Unlike drill riveting, the imperfect nature of the hole created by punch riveting caused manufacturing defect cracks which may have caused the start of fatigue cracks around the rivet.

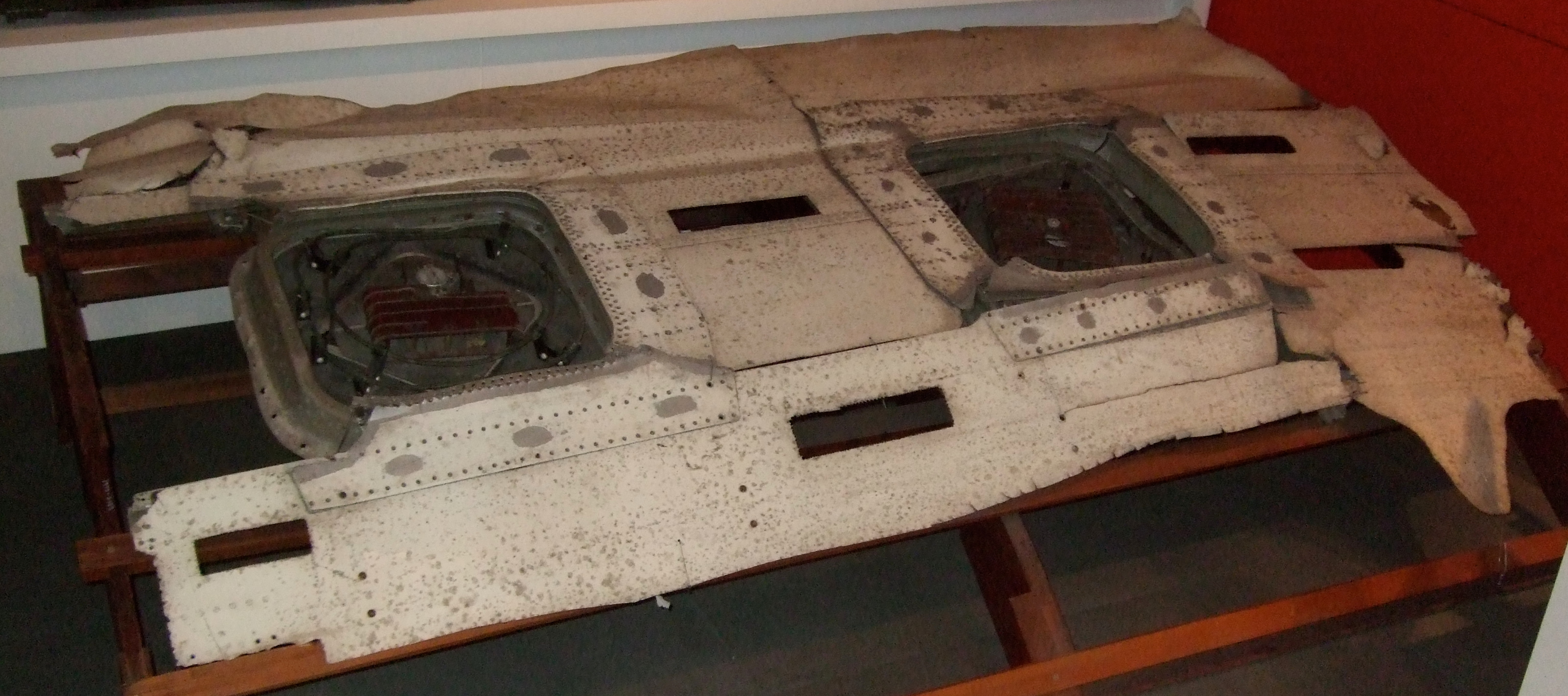
The fuselage roof fragment of G-ALYP on display in the Science Museum in London, showing the two ADF windows at which the initial failure occurred

The Comet's pressure cabin had been designed to a safety factor comfortably in excess of that required by British Civil Airworthiness Requirements (2.5 times the cabin proof test pressure as opposed to the requirement of 1.33 times and an ultimate load of 2.0 times the cabin pressure) and the accident caused a revision in the estimates of the safe loading strength requirements of airliner pressure cabins.

In addition, it was discovered that the stresses around pressure cabin apertures were considerably higher than had been anticipated, especially around sharp-cornered cut-outs, such as windows. As a result, all future jet airliners would feature windows with rounded corners, greatly reducing the stress concentration. This was a noticeable distinguishing feature of all later models of the Comet. Investigators from the RAE told a public inquiry that the sharp corners near the Comets' window openings acted as initiation sites for cracks. The skin of the aircraft was also too thin, and cracks from manufacturing stresses were present at the corners.

=== Alexander L. Kielland oil platform capsizing ===
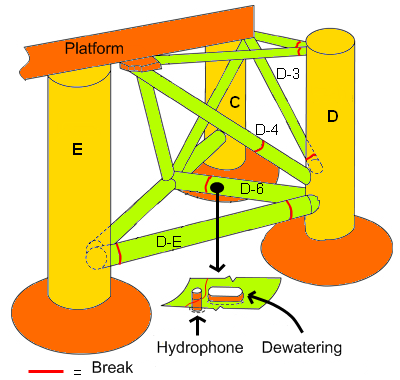
Fractures on the right side of the Alexander L. Kielland rig

Alexander L. Kielland was a Norwegian semi-submersible drilling rig that capsized whilst working in the Ekofisk oil field in March 1980, killing 123 people. The capsizing was the worst disaster in Norwegian waters since World War II. The rig, approximately 320 km east of Dundee, Scotland, was owned by the Stavanger Drilling Company of Norway and was on hire to the United States company Phillips Petroleum at the time of the disaster. In driving rain and mist, early in the evening of 27 March 1980 more than 200 men were off duty in the accommodation on Alexander L. Kielland. The wind was gusting to 40 knots with waves up to 12 m high. The rig had just been winched away from the Edda production platform. Minutes before 18:30 those on board felt a 'sharp crack' followed by 'some kind of trembling'. Suddenly the rig heeled over 30° and then stabilised. Five of the six anchor cables had broken, with one remaining cable preventing the rig from capsizing. The list continued to increase and at 18:53 the remaining anchor cable snapped and the rig turned upside down.

In March 1981, the investigative report concluded that the rig collapsed owing to a fatigue crack in one of its six bracings (bracing D-6), which connected the collapsed D-leg to the rest of the rig. This was traced to a small 6 mm fillet weld which joined a non-load-bearing flange plate to this D-6 bracing. This flange plate held a sonar device used during drilling operations. The poor profile of the fillet weld contributed to a reduction in its fatigue strength. Further, the investigation found considerable amounts of lamellar tearing in the flange plate and cold cracks in the butt weld. Cold cracks in the welds, increased stress concentrations due to the weakened flange plate, the poor weld profile, and cyclical stresses (which would be common in the North Sea), seemed to collectively play a role in the rig's collapse.

=== Others ===
- The 1862 Hartley Colliery Disaster was caused by the fracture of a steam engine beam and killed 204 people.
- The 1919 Boston Great Molasses Flood has been attributed to a fatigue failure.
- The 1948 Northwest Airlines Flight 421 crash due to fatigue failure in a wing spar root
- The 1957 "Mt. Pinatubo", presidential plane of Philippine President Ramon Magsaysay, crashed due to engine failure caused by metal fatigue.
- The 1965 capsize of the UK's first offshore oil platform, the Sea Gem, was due to fatigue in part of the suspension system linking the hull to the legs.
- The 1968 Los Angeles Airways Flight 417 lost one of its main rotor blades due to fatigue failure.
- The 1968 MacRobertson Miller Airlines Flight 1750 lost a wing due to improper maintenance leading to fatigue failure.
- The 1969 F-111A crash due to a fatigue failure of the wing pivot fitting from a material defect resulted in the development of the damage-tolerant approach for fatigue design.
- The 1977 Dan-Air Boeing 707 crash caused by fatigue failure resulting in the loss of the right horizontal stabilizer.
- The 1979 American Airlines Flight 191 crashed after engine separation attributed to fatigue damage in the pylon structure holding the engine to the wing, caused by improper maintenance procedures.
- The 1980 LOT Flight 7 crashed due to fatigue in an engine turbine shaft resulting in engine disintegration leading to loss of control.
- The 1985 Japan Airlines Flight 123 crashed after the aircraft lost its vertical stabilizer due to faulty repairs on the rear bulkhead.
- The 1988 Aloha Airlines Flight 243 suffered an explosive decompression at 24,000 feet (7,300 m) after a fatigue failure.
- The 1989 United Airlines Flight 232 lost its tail engine (and subsequently, all of its hydraulics) due to fatigue failure in a fan disk hub.
- The 1992 El Al Flight 1862 lost both engines on its right-wing due to fatigue failure in the pylon mounting of the #3 Engine.
- The 1998 Eschede train disaster was caused by fatigue failure of a single composite wheel.
- The 2000 Hatfield rail crash was likely caused by rolling contact fatigue.
- The 2000 recall of 6.5 million Firestone tires on Ford Explorers originated from fatigue crack growth leading to separation of the tread from the tire.
- The 2002 China Airlines Flight 611 disintegrated in-flight due to fatigue failure.
- The 2005 Chalk's Ocean Airways Flight 101 lost its right wing due to fatigue failure brought about by inadequate maintenance practices.
- The 2009 Viareggio train derailment due to fatigue failure.
- The 2009 Sayano–Shushenskaya power station accident due to metal fatigue of turbine mountings.
- The 2017 Air France Flight 66 had in-flight engine failure due to cold dwell fatigue fracture in the fan hub.
- The 2023 Titan submersible implosion is thought to have occurred due to fatigue delamination of the carbon-fibre used for the hull.

== See also ==
- Aviation safety – State in which risks associated with aviation are at an acceptable level
- Basquin's Law of Fatigue
- Critical plane analysis – Analysis of multiaxial stresses and strains
- Embedment
- Forensic materials engineering – Branch of forensic engineering
- Fractography – Study of the fracture surfaces of materials
- Smith fatigue strength diagram, a diagram by British mechanical engineer James Henry Smith
- Solder fatigue – Degradation of solder due to deformation under cyclic loading
- Thermo-mechanical fatigue
- Vibration fatigue
- International Journal of Fatigue
