= Aloha Airlines Flight 243 =

1988 aviation accident over the Pacific Ocean

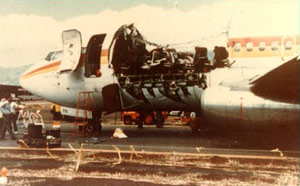
- The ruptured fuselage after landing

Accident
- Date: April 28, 1988
- Summary: Emergency landing following in-flight structural failure and explosive decompression due to maintenance error
- Site: near Kahului, Hawaii, U.S.; 20°32′N 156°17′W

Aircraft
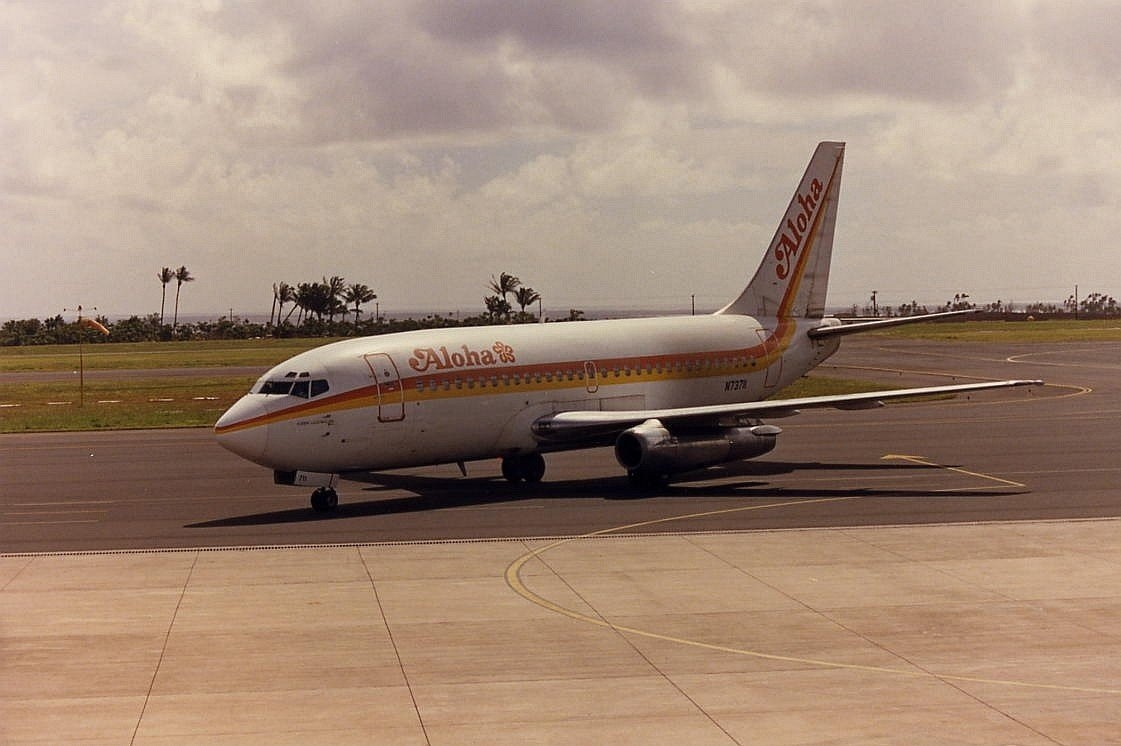
- N73711, the aircraft involved, seen in February 1988, 2 months before the accident.
- Aircraft type: Boeing 737-297
- Aircraft name: Queen Liliuokalani
- Operator: Aloha Airlines
- IATA flight No.: AQ243
- ICAO flight No.: AAH243
- Call sign: ALOHA 243
- Registration: N73711
- Flight origin: Hilo International Airport, Hilo, Hawaii, U.S.
- Destination: Honolulu International Airport, Honolulu, Hawaii, U.S.
- Occupants: 95
- Passengers: 90
- Crew: 5
- Fatalities: 1
- Injuries: 65
- Survivors: 94

Aloha Airlines Flight 243 was a scheduled domestic passenger flight flown by Aloha Airlines between Hilo and Honolulu in Hawaii. On April 28, 1988, the Boeing 737-200 airplane serving the flight suffered extensive damage after an explosive decompression in flight, caused by part of the fuselage breaking due to poor maintenance and metal fatigue. The plane was able to land safely at Kahului Airport on Maui. The one fatality, flight attendant Clarabelle "C.B." Lansing, was ejected from the airplane. Sixty-five passengers and crew were injured. The substantial damage inflicted by the decompression, the loss of one cabin crew member, and the safe landing of the aircraft established the accident as a significant event in the history of aviation, with far-reaching effects on aviation safety policies and procedures.

== Background ==
=== Aircraft ===
The aircraft involved was a Boeing 737-297 registered as N73711, manufactured in 1969. Prior to the accident, it had accumulated 35,496 flight hours in 89,680 flight cycles (takeoffs and landings), owing to its use on short flights; however, this also meant that the maximum altitude and pressure differential was not reached on every flight, so the number of equivalent full pressurization cycles was significantly less. During the 737 certification, a representative half section of its fuselage went through 150,000 full pressurization cycles (two times the economic design life goal of 75,000 cycles and 51,000 hours); however, this did not consider effects of corrosion in real practice. At the time of the accident, Aloha Airlines operated the two highest flight-cycle Boeing 737s in the world, with the accident aircraft being number two.

=== Crew ===
In command was 44-year-old Captain Robert Schornstheimer, an experienced pilot with 8,500 flight hours, 6,700 of which were in Boeing 737s. The first officer was 36-year-old Mimi Tompkins, who also had significant experience flying the 737, having logged 3,500 of her total 8,000 flight hours in that model.

== Accident ==
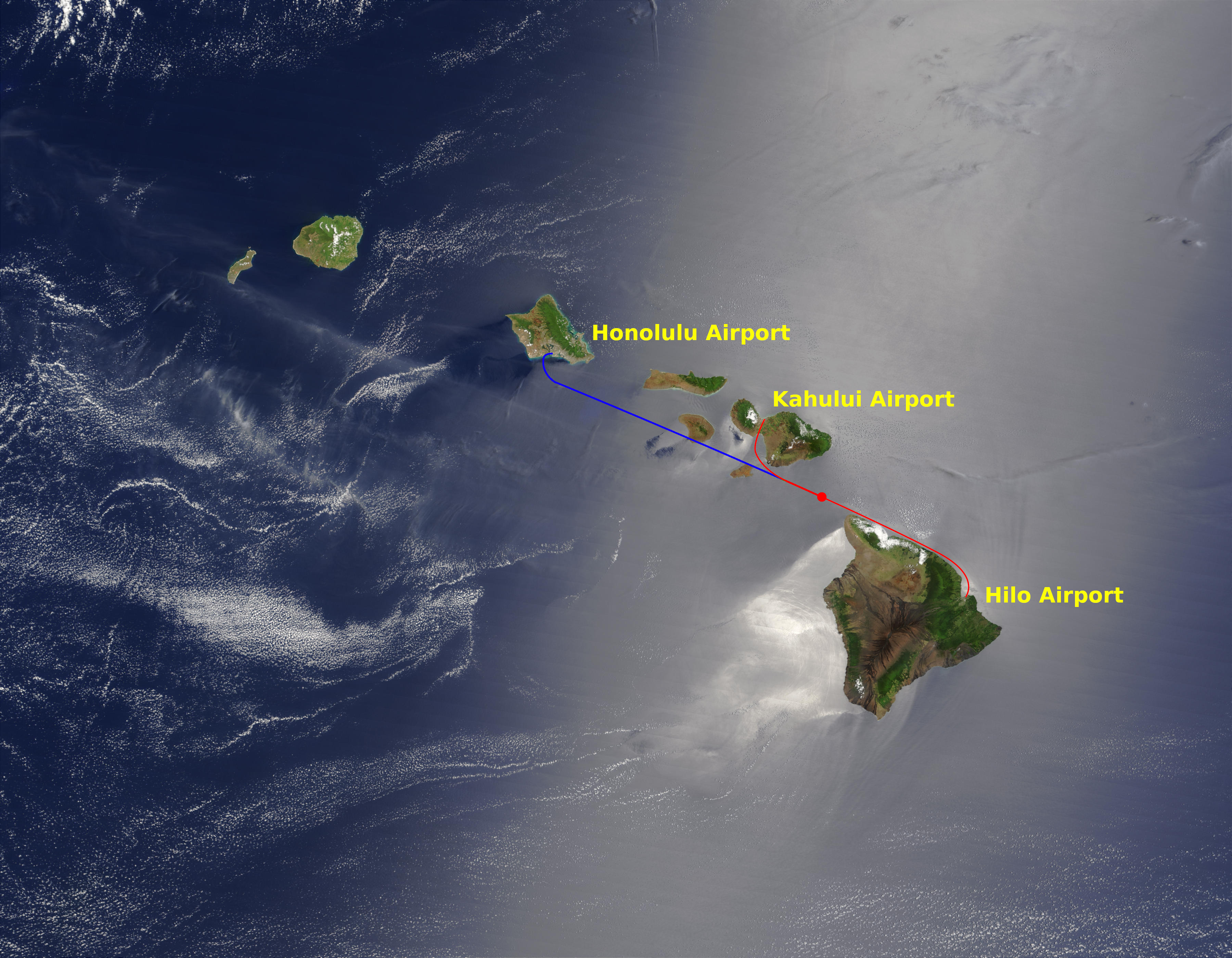
Flight 243 route: red – actually flown, including the emergency landing on Maui; blue – rest of original flight plan

Flight 243 departed from Hilo International Airport at 13:25 HST on April 28, 1988, with 5 crew members and 90 passengers on board (including an air traffic controller travelling on the cockpit jumpseat), bound for Honolulu. Nothing unusual was noted during the pre-departure inspection of the aircraft, which had already completed three uneventful round-trip flights between Honolulu and Hilo, Maui, and Kauai earlier that day. Meteorological conditions were checked, but no advisories for weather phenomena were reported along the air route, per AIRMETs or SIGMETs.

After a routine takeoff and ascent, just as the aircraft had reached its normal flight altitude of 24,000 feet (7,300 m), at 13:46, about 23 nautical miles (43 km; 26 mi) south-southeast of Kahului on Maui, a section on the left side of the roof ruptured with a "whooshing" sound. The captain felt the aircraft roll to the left and right, and the controls went loose; the first officer noticed pieces of gray insulation "floating in the cockpit". The cockpit door had broken away and the captain could see "blue sky where the first-class ceiling had been." A large section of the roof had torn off, consisting of the entire top half of the aircraft skin extending from just behind the cockpit to the fore-wing area, a length of about 18 feet (5.5 m).

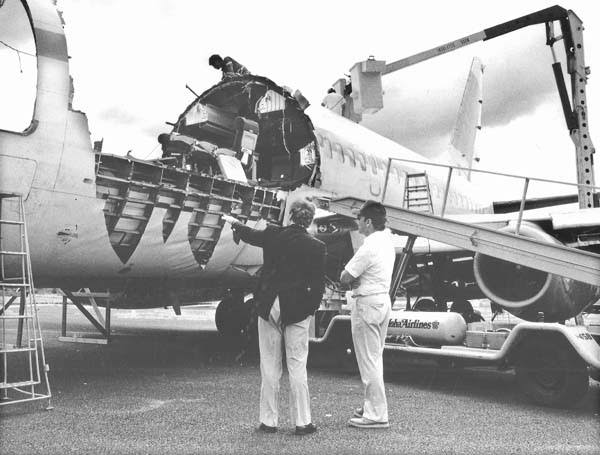
Left view of the torn fuselage

The only fatality was 58-year-old chief flight attendant Clarabelle "C.B." Lansing, a veteran of 37 years, who was swept out of the airplane while standing near the fifth-row seats; her body was never found. Eight other people, including one flight attendant, suffered serious injuries; 57 passengers suffered minor injuries. All passengers had been seated and were wearing their seat belts during the depressurization.

First Officer Tompkins was the pilot flying at the time of the accident; Captain Schornstheimer took over controls and performed an immediate emergency descent. The crew declared an emergency and diverted to Kahului Airport for an emergency landing. During the approach to the airport, the left engine failed, and the flight crew was unsure if the nose gear were lowered correctly. Nevertheless, they landed normally on Runway 2, thirteen minutes after the accident. Upon landing, the aircraft's emergency evacuation slides were deployed and passengers quickly evacuated from the aircraft. Sixty-five people were reported injured, eight of them seriously. At the time, Maui had no plan in place for such an emergency. The injured were taken to the hospital in tour vans belonging to Akamai Tours, driven by office personnel and mechanics, as the island only had two ambulances. Air traffic control radioed Akamai and requested as many of their 15-passenger vans as they could spare to go to the airport (which was 3 miles (4.8 km) from their base) to transport the injured. Two of the Akamai drivers were former paramedics and established a triage on the runway.

== Aftermath ==
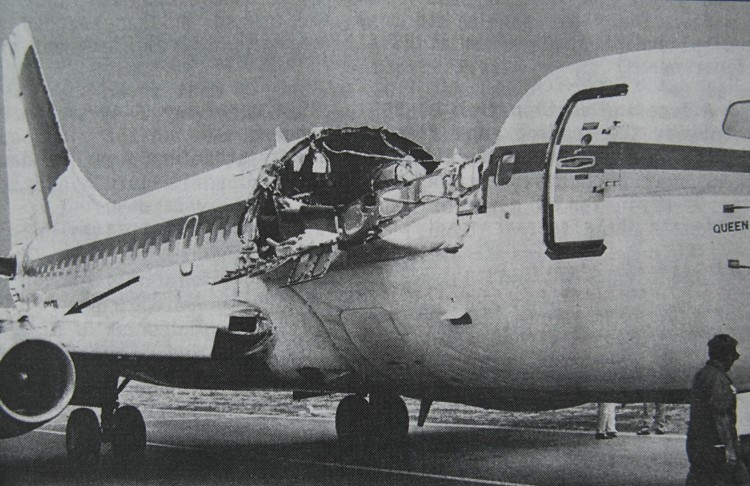
Fig. 2b of the investigation report: arrow marks fragments of S-4B section lodged in the leading edge flap

Additional damage to the airplane included damaged and dented horizontal stabilizers, both of which had been struck by flying debris. Some of the metal debris had also struck the vertical stabilizer, causing slight damage. The leading edges of both wings and both engine cowlings had also sustained damage. The aircraft was damaged beyond repair, dismantled on site and written off.

The piece of the fuselage blown off the aircraft has never been found. Investigation by the U. S. National Transportation Safety Board (NTSB) concluded that the accident was caused by metal fatigue exacerbated by crevice corrosion. The aircraft was 19 years old and operated in a coastal environment, with exposure to salt and humidity.

During an interview, passenger Gayle Yamamoto told investigators that she had noticed a crack in the fuselage upon boarding, but did not notify anyone.

In 1995, a garden in Terminal 1 of Honolulu International Airport was named in honor of flight attendant Lansing.

== Construction ==
The accident aircraft was line number 152. All 737s starting with line number 292 included an additional outer layer of skin or doubler sheet at the lap joint of the fuselage, giving an additional thickness of 0.036 in (0.91 mm) at the lap joint. Up to line number 291, i.e., also in the accident aircraft, cold bonding had been used, with fasteners used to maintain surface contact in the joint, allowing bonding adhesive to transfer load within the joint. This cold-bonded joint used an epoxy-impregnated woven scrim cloth to join the edges of 0.035 in thick (0.9 mm) skin panels. These epoxy cloths were reactive at room temperature, so they were stored at dry ice temperatures until used. The bond cured at room temperature after assembly. The cold-bonding process reduced the overall weight and manufacturing cost. Fuselage hoop loads (circumferential loads within the skins due to pressurization of the cabin) were intended to be transferred through the bonded joint, rather than through the rivets, allowing the use of lighter, thinner fuselage skin panels with no degradation in fatigue life.

The additional outer layer construction improved the joint by:

- Eliminating the knife-edge fatigue detail, which resulted from the countersinking of the panels for flush rivets in a disbonded upper skin, and
- Eliminating the corrosion concern associated with the scrim cloth, which could wick moisture into the lap joint

== Conclusion ==
The NTSB investigation determined that the quality of inspection and maintenance programs was deficient. Fuselage examinations were scheduled during the night, which made carrying out an adequate inspection of the aircraft's outer skin more difficult.

The fuselage failure initiated in the lap joint along S-10L; the failure mechanism was a result of multiple-site fatigue cracking of the skin adjacent to rivet holes along the lap joint upper rivet row and tear strap disbond, which negated the fail-safe characteristics of the fuselage.
The fatigue cracking initiated from the knife edge associated with the countersunk lap joint rivet holes; the knife edge concentrated stresses that were transferred through the rivets because of lap joint disbonding.

The NTSB concluded in its final report that

the probable cause of this accident was the failure of the Aloha Airlines maintenance program to detect the presence of significant disbonding and fatigue damage which ultimately led to failure of the lap joint at S-10L and the separation of the fuselage upper lobe. Contributing to the accident were the failure of Aloha Airlines management to supervise properly its maintenance force; the failure of the FAA to require Airworthiness Directive 87-21-08 inspection of all the lap joints proposed by Boeing Alert Service Bulletin SB 737-53A1039; and the lack of a complete terminating action (neither generated by Boeing nor required by the FAA) after the discovery of early production difficulties in the B-737 cold-bond lap joint, which resulted in low bond durability, corrosion, and premature fatigue cracking.

One of five board members dissented, arguing that "undetected fatigue cracking" was clearly the probable cause, but that Aloha Airlines maintenance should not be singled out within it because the accident could not be "reasonably foreseen" and a "system failure" by the FAA, Boeing, and Aloha each were merely contributing factors.

== In popular culture ==
- The events of Flight 243 were featured in "Hanging by a Thread", a season-three (2005) episode of the Canadian television series Mayday (called Air Emergency and Air Disasters in the U.S. and Air Crash Investigation in the UK and elsewhere around the world). The flight was also included in Mayday season six (2007) Science of Disaster special titled "Ripped Apart".
- The story of Flight 243 was the subject of the 1990 made-for-television movie called Miracle Landing.
- A memorial garden was opened in 1995 to honor Lansing at Honolulu International Airport.
- It is featured in season 1, episode 2, of the television show Why Planes Crash, in an episode called "Breaking Point".
- The Vampire Weekend album Only God Was Above Us is named after a New York Daily News article about the accident.

== See also ==
- United Airlines Flight 811, also in Hawaii, an accident in which a cargo door failure caused explosive decompression and nine passengers were ejected from the aircraft and killed, but the crew was able to perform a safe landing, 1989
- Far Eastern Air Transport Flight 103, an identical aircraft type, immediately adjacent on the production line, with line number 151, which disintegrated in midair due to metal fatigue cracking and severe corrosion, killing all 110 on board, 1981
- China Airlines Flight 611, a Boeing 747-200 that suffered a structural failure after a maintenance error was made in fixing fatigue cracking from a tail strike 22 years earlier, resulting in death of all 225 aboard, 2002
- Japan Air Lines Flight 123, a flight that suffered a structural failure also caused by a poor repair after encountering a tail strike seven years earlier, 520 killed and 4 injured, 1985
- Chalk's Ocean Airways Flight 101, a flight that suffered a structural failure and separation of a wing from the fuselage due to metal fatigue, resulting in death of all 20 aboard, 2005
- List of notable decompression accidents and incidents
