= Cyclic stress =

Cyclic stress is the distribution of forces (a.k.a. stresses) that change over time in a repetitive fashion. As an example, consider one of the large wheels used to drive an aerial lift such as a ski lift. The wire cable wrapped around the wheel exerts a downward force on the wheel and the drive shaft supporting the wheel. Although the shaft, wheel, and cable move, the force remains nearly vertical relative to the ground. Thus a point on the surface of the drive shaft will undergo tension when it is pointing towards the ground and compression when it is pointing to the sky.

== Types of cyclic stress ==
Cyclic stress is frequently encountered in rotating machinery where a bending moment is applied to a rotating part. This is called a cyclic bending stress and the aerial lift above is a good example. However, cyclic axial stresses and cyclic torsional stresses also exist. An example of cyclic axial stress would be a bungee cord (see bungee jumping), which must support the mass of people as they jump off structures such as bridges. When a person reaches the end of a cord, the cord deflects elastically and stops the person's descent. This creates a large axial stress in the cord. A fraction of the elastic potential energy stored in the cord is typically transferred back to the person, throwing the person upwards some fraction of the distance he or she fell. The person then falls on the cord again, inducing stress in the cord. This happens multiple times per jump. The same cord is used for several jumps, creating cyclical stresses in the cord that could eventually cause failure if not replaced.

== Cyclic stress and material failure ==
When cyclic stresses are applied to a material, even though the stresses do not cause plastic deformation, the material may fail due to fatigue. Fatigue failure is typically modeled by decomposing cyclic stresses into mean and alternating components. Mean stress is the time average of the principal stress. The definition of alternating stress varies between different sources. It is either defined as the difference between the minimum and the maximum stress, or the difference between the mean and maximum stress. Engineers try to design mechanisms whose parts are subjected to a single type (bending, axial, or torsional) of cyclic stress because this more closely matches experiments used to characterize fatigue failure in different materials.
