= Joseph Glynn (engineer) =

British steam engine designer (1799–1863)

Joseph Glynn, FRS FRSA (6 February 1799 – 6 February 1863) was a British steam engine designer.

He was born the son of James Glynn of the Ouseburn Iron Foundry in Newcastle upon Tyne and taught by John Bruce at the Percy Street Academy.

He started work as an assistant to his father at the Ouseburn foundry until 1820 when he designed and built a steam engine to drain the Talkin Colliery in Cumberland. In 1821 he designed the system for street lighting by coal gas in Berwick-on-Tweed and subsequently in Aberdeen.

He moved to become Chief Engineer at the Butterley Iron Company in Derbyshire, where he improved the design of the emergent steam engines up to 200 horse power. He was then commissioned to design a series of marine steam engines for the General Steam Navigation Company including the William Jolliffe, built in 1826, with a beam engine of 100 h.p. and the Harlequin built in the same year again with a Butterley Co.built beam engine and for the Royal Navy (HMS Firefly and HMS Firebrand).

His most remembered achievement was the design and construction of steam engines to drain the Fens of eastern England, making it possible to farm many thousands of acres for the first time.

He wrote a book "Cranes, the Construction of, and other Machinery for Raising Heavy Bodies"

He was elected a Fellow of the Royal Society in 1838. He died in London in 1863 and was buried in Kensal Green Cemetery.
