= Fatigue limit =

Maximum stress that will not cause fatigue failure

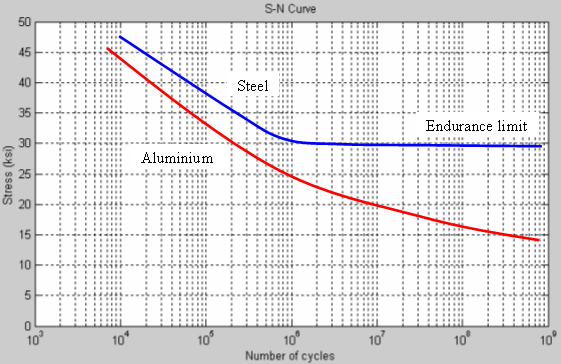
Representative curves of applied stress vs number of cycles for steel (showing an endurance limit) and aluminium (showing no such limit).

The fatigue limit, endurance limit is the stress level below which an infinite number of loading cycles can be applied to a material without causing fatigue failure. Some metals such as ferrous alloys and titanium alloys have a distinct limit, whereas others such as aluminium and copper do not and will eventually fail even from small stress amplitudes. Where materials do not have a distinct limit the term fatigue strength or endurance strength is used and is defined as the maximum value of completely reversed bending stress that a material can withstand for a specified number of cycles without a fatigue failure. For polymeric materials, the fatigue limit is also commonly known as the intrinsic strength.

== Definitions ==
The ASTM defines fatigue strength, $S_{N_f}$, as "the value of stress at which failure occurs after $N_f$ cycles", and fatigue limit, $S_f$, as "the limiting value of stress at which failure occurs as $N_f$ becomes very large". ASTM does not define endurance limit, the stress value below which the material will withstand many load cycles, but implies that it is similar to fatigue limit.

Some authors use endurance limit, $S_e$, for the stress below which failure never occurs, even for an indefinitely large number of loading cycles, as in the case of steel; and fatigue limit or fatigue strength, $S_f$, for the stress at which failure occurs after a specified number of loading cycles, such as 500 million, as in the case of aluminium. Other authors do not differentiate between the expressions even if they do differentiate between the two types of materials.

== Typical values ==
Typical values of the limit ($S_e$) for steels are one half the ultimate tensile strength, to a maximum of 290 MPa (42 ksi). For iron, aluminium, and copper alloys, $S_e$ is typically 0.4 times the ultimate tensile strength. Maximum typical values for irons are 170 MPa (24 ksi), aluminums 130 MPa (19 ksi), and coppers 97 MPa (14 ksi). Note that these values are for smooth "un-notched" test specimens. The endurance limit for notched specimens (and thus for many practical design situations) is significantly lower.

For polymeric materials, the fatigue limit has been shown to reflect the intrinsic strength of the covalent bonds in polymer chains that must be ruptured in order to extend a crack. So long as other thermo-chemical processes do not break the polymer chain (i.e. ageing or ozone attack), a polymer may operate indefinitely without crack growth when loads are kept below the intrinsic strength.

The concept of fatigue limit, and thus standards based on a fatigue limit such as ISO 281:2007 rolling bearing lifetime prediction, remains controversial, at least in the US.

== Modifying factors of fatigue limit ==
The fatigue limit of a machine component, Se, is influenced by a series of elements named modifying factors.

$S_e = S'_e . C_s . C_L . C_d . C_t . C_r . C_m$

where:

- $S'_e$′= Theoretical endurance limit from laboratory tests
- $C_s$ = Surface condition modification factor
- $C_L$ = Size modification factor
- $C_d$ = Load modification factor
- $C_t$= Temperature modification factor
- $C_r$ = Reliability factor
- $C_m$= Miscellaneous effects modification factor

Some of these factors are listed below.

=== Surface factor ===
The surface modifying factor, $C_s$, is related to both the tensile strength, $S_{ut}$, of the material and the surface finish of the machine component.

$C_{s}=aS_{ut}^b$

Where factor a and exponent b present in the equation are related to the surface finish, and are determined experimentally.

Fatigue cracks usually initiate on the surface of the material. Stress concentrations are lower for smoother surfaces, resulting in a higher fatigue strength and hence, a higher fatigue limit. On the other hand, rougher surfaces results in increased stress concentrations, thus lowering the fatigue limit.

=== Gradient factor ===
Besides taking into account the surface finish, it is also important to consider the size gradient factor $k_{G}$. Stress gradient factor accounts for the effect of stress gradients on fatigue life, particularly at locations with stress concentrations like notches, by modifying the fatigue strength reduction factor. When it comes to bending and torsional loading, the gradient factor is also taken into consideration.

$C_g = \frac{S'_{e}}{S_{e}}$

where

- $S'_e$ = Modified endurance limit
- $S_e$ = Theoretical endurance limit from unnotched specimens
- $C_g$ = Stress gradient factor

=== Load factor ===
The strength values derived from the S-N (Wohler plot) is as a result from a reversing bending load as the test specimen is rotated. In rotating-bending tests, every point on the diameter surface of the specimen experiences a bending stress in one direction and then in the opposite direction, with only a limited area on the outer surface experiencing the peak stress level. The reversed axial loading scenario exhibits a significantly tougher condition because the entire cross-section is subjected to the full stress rather than just the surface elements. (The strength values noted for reversed axial loading have been documented at varying ratios ranging from 0.7 to 0.85 times those reported for reversed bending). In the reversed torsion scenario, the loading involves shear rather than bending.

Load modifying factor can be identified as.

$k_{L}=0.85$ for axial

$k_{L}=1$ for bending

$k_{L}=0.59$ for pure torsion

=== Temperature factor ===
The temperature factor is calculated as

$k_{T}= \frac{S_{o}}{S_{r}}$

$S_o$ is tensile strength at operating temperature

$S_{r}$ is tensile strength at room temperature

=== Reliability factor ===
We can calculate the reliability factor using the equation,

$k_{R}=1-0.08Z_{a}$

$z_{a}=0$ for 50% reliability

$z_{a}=1.288$ for 90% reliability

$z_{a}=1.645$ for 95% reliability

$z_{a}=2.326$ for 99% reliability

=== Miscellaneous Effects Modification Factor ===
This factor includes other factors that influences the endurance limit of a material, such as environmental conditions (e.g., corrosion, humidity), Residual stresses from manufacturing processes, and the presence of notches or other geometric discontinuities. These factors can either enhance or degrade fatigue performance, depending on their nature and severity.

== History ==
=== Early Observations and the Birth of Fatigue Studies (1837-1870) ===
The concept of fatigue was first introduced in the early 19th century when Wilhelm Albert conducted the first recorded fatigue tests on mining chains in 1837. He observed that metal components could fail under repeated loading, even if the stresses were well below the material’s ultimate tensile strength (Schütz, 1996).

In 1854, the term "fatigue" was first used by Braithwaite to describe material degradation under cyclic loading. However, it was August Wöhler (1858-1870) who laid the foundation of modern fatigue analysis. As a railway engineer, Wöhler systematically studied the failure of railway axles, developing the S-N curve (Wöhler curve), which remains a fundamental tool in fatigue analysis today (Schütz, 1996). His work demonstrated that materials could fail due to cyclic stress even when stresses were below the yield strength.

=== Advancements in Fatigue Research (1870-1925) ===
The period following Wöhler’s work saw significant progress:

- Bauschinger Effect (1880)s: Johann Bauschinger discovered that cyclic loading could alter the yield strength of metals, influencing the development of fatigue life models.
- Stress Concentration Factor (1898): Kirsch calculated the stress concentration factor for holes in materials, explaining why cracks often initiate at discontinuities.
- Metallurgical Insights (1903): Ewing and Humfrey identified microscopic slip bands as the first evidence of fatigue damage in metals.

=== The Golden Era of Fatigue Studies (1925-1945) ===
Between 1925 and 1945, fatigue research expanded with contributions from multiple countries, particularly Germany:

- Thum and Bautz (1937): Introduced the concept of "Gestaltfestigkeit", emphasizing component shape over material properties in fatigue resistance.
- Gassner’s Variable Amplitude Fatigue Tests (1939): Revolutionized fatigue testing by replicating real-world service loads, leading to modern operational fatigue testing.
- Shot Peening (1940s): Methods to improve fatigue strength, such as cold rolling and shot peening, were explored.

=== Post-War Developments and Modern Fatigue Strength Research (1945-Present) ===
After World War II, fatigue failures in aircraft, bridges, and automobiles accelerated research:

- Miner’s Rule (1945): Introduced a cumulative damage hypothesis to predict fatigue life under variable loading.
- Paris Law (1960s): Paul Paris developed a model for crack propagation based on fracture mechanics.
- Low-Cycle Fatigue (1954): Manson and Coffin introduced strain-based fatigue life prediction methods, critical for high-temperature applications.

However, recent research suggests that endurance limits do not exist for metallic materials, that if enough stress cycles are performed, even the smallest stress will eventually produce fatigue failure.

== See also ==
- Fatigue (material)
- Smith fatigue strength diagram, a diagram by British mechanical engineer James Henry Smith
