= August Wöhler =

German railway engineer

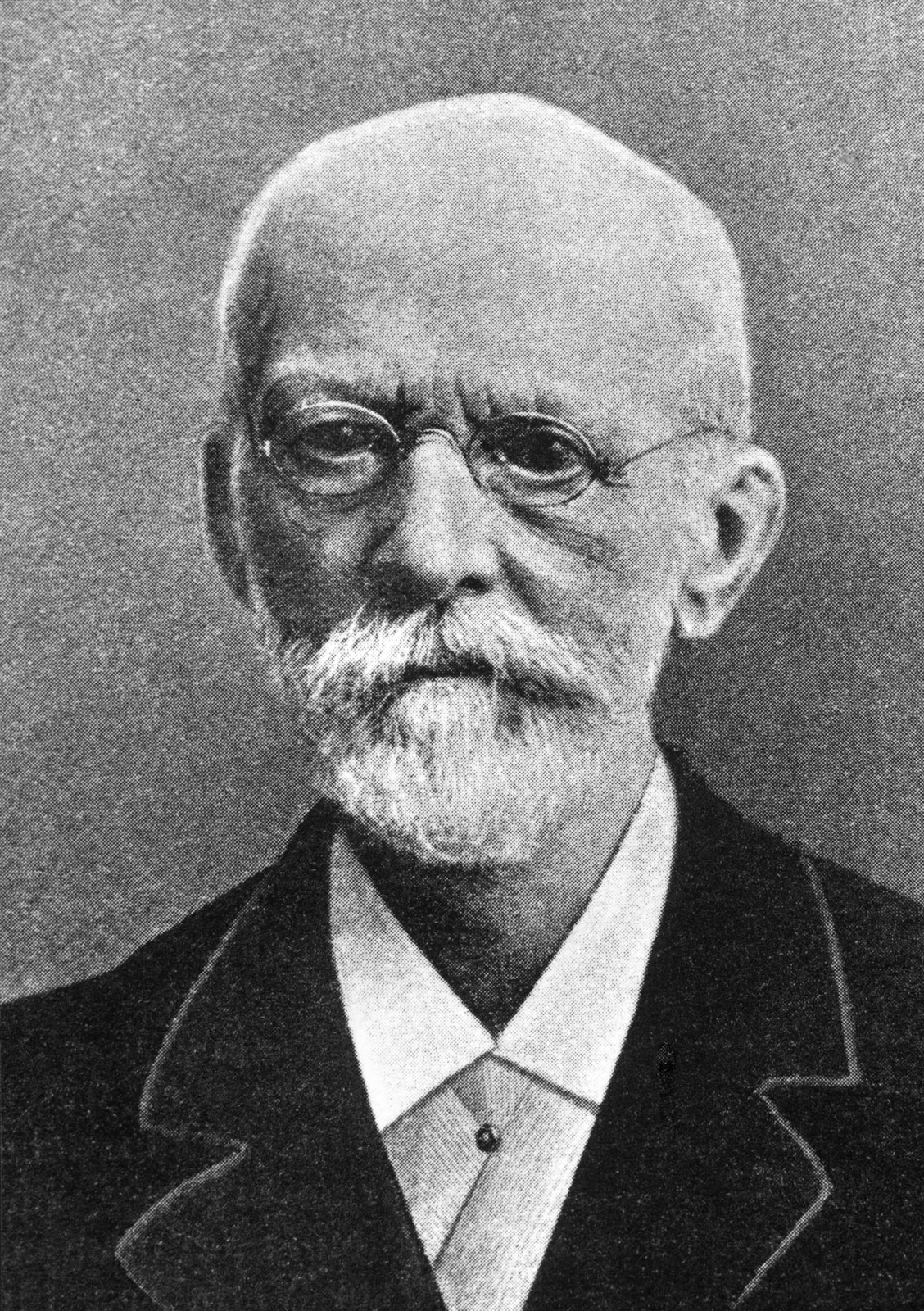
- August Wöhler
- Born: 22 June 1819; Soltau, Hanover
- Died: 21 March 1914 (aged 94); Hanover, Prussia
- Known for: Wöhler curves Fatigue limit
- Scientific career
- Fields: Engineering
- Academic advisors: Karl Karmarsch

August Wöhler (22 June 1819 – 21 March 1914) was a German railway engineer, best remembered for his systematic investigations of metal fatigue.

== Life ==
Born in the town of Soltau, Hanover, the son of local teacher Georg Heinrich Wöhler, he showed early mathematical ability and won a scholarship to study at the Higher Vocational College of Hannover from 1835, under the direction of Karl Karmarsch.

In 1840, he was recruited to the Borsig works in Berlin where he worked on the manufacture of rail tracks. In 1843, after a brief stay in Hannover, he started to receive instruction in locomotive driving in Belgium, returning as an engineer on the Hanover-Brunswick line of the Royal Hanoverian State Railways. By 1847, Wöhler was chief superintendent of rolling stock on the Lower Silesian-Marcher railway in Frankfurt (Oder).

The railroad was nationalised by the Prussian state railways in 1852 and Wöhler's growing reputation led to his appointment by the Prussian Ministry of Commerce to investigate the causes of fracture in railroad axles, work that was to occupy Wöhler over the next two decades. The recognition of his keen administration and technical leadership resulted in his appointment as director of the newly formed Imperial Railways in Alsace-Lorraine in 1874, based at the board's headquarters in Straßburg, a post he held until his retirement in 1889.

== Fatigue studies ==
Wöhler started his axle investigations by research into the theory of elasticity and was led, in 1855, to a method for predicting the deflection of lattice beams that anticipated the work of Émile Clapeyron. He also introduced the practice of supporting one end of a bridge on roller bearings to allow for thermal expansion.

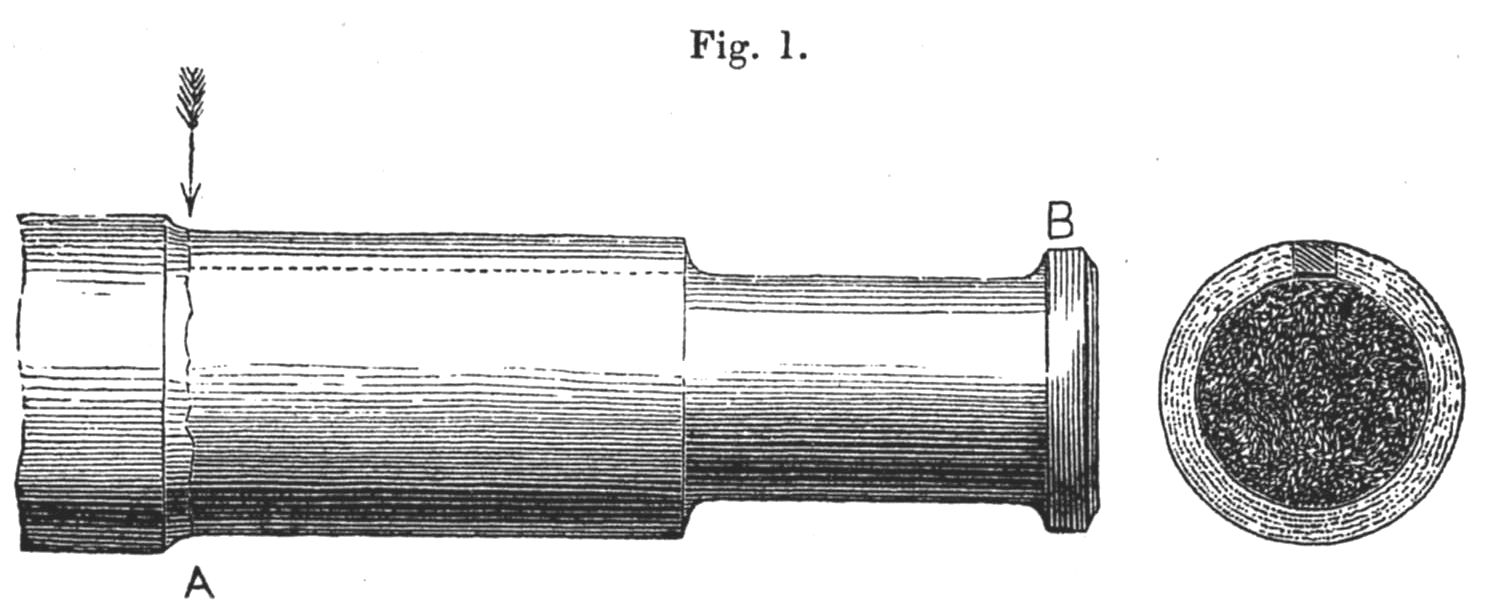
Drawing of a fatigue failure in an axle, sketched by Joseph Glynn following the Versailles accident, 1842^{5}

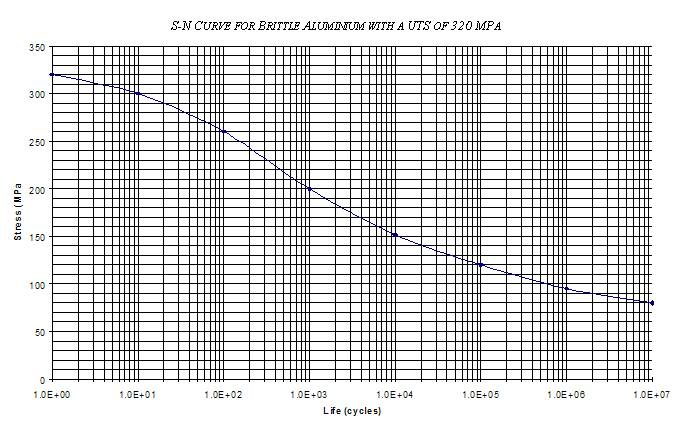
S-N curve of aluminium alloy

His work on fatigue marks the first systematic investigation of S-N curves, also known as Wöhler curves, to characterise the fatigue behaviour of materials. Such curves can be used to minimise the problem of fatigue by lowering the stress at critical points in a component. Wöhler showed clearly that fatigue occurs by crack growth from surface defects until the product can no longer support the applied load. The history of a fracture can be understood from a study of the fracture surface. He developed apparatus for repeated loading of railway axles, mainly because many accidents were caused by sudden fatigue fracture. The presentation of his work at the Paris Exposition in 1867 brought it to a wide international audience.

Wöhler was an advocate of state standardisation, testing and certification of iron and steel.

He died in Hannover in 1914.
