= Kia Challenge =

2022 thefts of Kia and Hyundai vehicles

- Date: October 2022 – present
- Location: United States (primarily), incidents in Australia and Canada
- Type: Viral internet challenge, motor vehicle theft
- Target: Hyundai and Kia vehicles with steel keys
- Deaths: 8+

The Kia Challenge is the viral TikTok trend to which a series of motor vehicle thefts is attributed, targeting Kia and Hyundai vehicles in the United States manufactured between 2011 and 2021. The trend, which began in October 2022, has led to eight fatalities, according to the National Highway Traffic Safety Administration.

== Background ==
=== Absence of immobilizers (2011–2021) ===
Affected vehicles
Brand	Model	Model years
Hyundai	Accent	2015–2021
Hyundai	Elantra	2015–2021
Hyundai	Kona	2015–2021
Hyundai	Santa Fe	2015–2021
Hyundai	Tucson	2015–2021
Hyundai	Veloster	2015–2018
Kia	Forte	2015–2021
Kia	Optima	2015–2021
Kia	Optima Hybrid	2015–2016
Kia	Rio	2015–2021
Kia	Sedona	2015–2021
Kia	Sorento	2015–2016
Kia	Soul	2015–2021
Kia	Sportage	2015–2021

Until 2011, most Hyundai and Kia vehicles were manufactured with immobilizers—electronic security devices that prevent the engine from being started unless a proper key is inserted—a system present in most Hyundai vehicles until 2016. In Kia Sportage models manufactured in 2010, the immobilizer system comprised a transponder in the ignition key, an antenna coil in the key cylinder, and a SMARTRA unit. Kia vehicles manufactured from 2011 to 2021 for the US market and Hyundai vehicles manufactured from 2016 to 2021 for the US market that use a steel key, in comparison to a key fob and a push-button start mechanism, lack immobilizers.

=== Kia Boys and thefts (2021–2023) ===
In February 2021, Milwaukee, Wisconsin began experiencing an increase in reckless driving and car thefts, particularly cars manufactured by Kia and Hyundai. In response, the Milwaukee Police Department began offering free steering-wheel locks to owners. A Traffic Safety Unit was formed in March. In June, a 16-year-old was killed and five other teenagers were injured following a police pursuit.

The perpetrators of these car thefts remained isolated until a video circulated in August showing an unidentified driver nearly striking pedestrians at John Marshall High School, when some began using hashtags identifying themselves as members of the "Kia Boys" or "Kia Boyz". Members of the Kia Boyz were depicted in a documentary uploaded to YouTube in May 2022; the video depicts a stolen red 2021 Hyundai Elantra from Hertz. Police identified the driver as 17-year-old Markell Hughes and arrested him in June. In 2023, he was again accused of driving another stolen car.

A video was posted on TikTok on July 12, 2022, where the author uses a USB connector on a naked key slot and successfully starts a car. This vulnerability exists on a type of ignition switch used in many Kia/Hyundai cars sold until 2021, which are not equipped with an immobilizer system. The video was taken down on July 25.

== Incidents ==
=== Australia ===
In Brisbane, two Kia cars were damaged by Kia Challenge participants in failed attempts to steal the vehicles. This is despite the vulnerability not existing in Australian cars manufactured since 2001.

=== Canada ===
Immobilizers are required by law in all new vehicles sold in Canada since 2007, so only cars imported from the US are susceptible.

On November 11, 2023, a senior woman in Summerland, British Columbia had her car severely damaged, with the words "Kia Boys Failed" and other vulgar language written on it. The vandals targeted her car due to its make, and it is suspected that they returned to steal the vehicle after the initial vandalism.

=== Ireland ===
On August 16, 2026, 5 teenage boys on the M9 between the ages of 15 to 18 were speeding on the wrong side of the road in a stolen BMW when they hit a Hyundai carrying 4 passengers. All 5 of the occupants of the BMW were declared dead at the scene and the occupants of the Hyundai were hospitalized. The Garda had pursuited the stolen BMW earlier in the evening to no avail. Garda later revealed social media, particularly TikTok, had promoted dangerous driving and had led to the crash.

=== United States ===
In Los Angeles, the trend has been linked to an 85% increase in thefts of Kia and Hyundai vehicles in 2022 compared to 2021. In Chicago, thefts of the affected vehicle models increased by over nine times, and children as young as 11 years of age were reported to have participated in these thefts.

==== Illinois ====
On April 29, 2024, four teenagers aged 13 to 17 were involved in a fatal single-car accident in Johnston City, Illinois following the theft of a 2013 Hyundai Elantra. The 16-year-old driver was killed after crashing into a tree, leaving the other three passengers with serious injuries.

==== Maryland ====
On August 4, 2026, seven teenagers aged 12 to 15 were involved in a fatal accident in Germantown, Maryland following the theft of a 2015 Kia Optima. The 58-year-old driver of a 2007 Toyota Matrix was killed after being struck by the Kia, which was later reported to be stolen. The alleged driver of the Kia, a 13-year-old boy, was also injured in the crash.

==== New York ====
On October 23, 2022, six teenagers aged 14 to 19 stole a Kia Sportage in Buffalo, New York. Four of the teenagers were killed when they subsequently crashed the stolen car. The Buffalo Police Department linked the incident to the Kia Challenge.

==== Pennsylvania ====
On May 28, 2024, five teenagers were taken into custody after they struck and killed a 55-year-old male motorcyclist in Philadelphia while driving a stolen Kia car. The alleged driver of the Kia was a 17-year-old male and the other teens, all females, were between the ages of 14 and 17.

==== Washington ====
On December 2, 2023, five teenagers in Lakewood, Washington were driving in a stolen Kia Sportage with at least three guns in their possession. Lakewood police attempted to stop the vehicle after receiving reports that it was stolen, and would later cite the "Kia Boyz" online trend for the crime. One of the occupants, a 16-year-old boy, drowned in a Lakewood swamp while fleeing the police. A 14-year-old and 17-year-old were charged; two others including an adult remain at large.

== Responses from involved companies ==
TikTok has committed to removing pertinent videos uploaded by Kia Challenge thieves from the platform. Kia and Hyundai have both expressed awareness of the increased thefts of their vehicles, with Kia also noting that new vehicles starting with their 2022 model year now come with immobilizers installed.

Starting February 14, 2023, Hyundai introduced a free anti-theft software patch for some models of vehicle, and by June 23, all remaining eligible vehicles will have a patch that can be installed at a Hyundai dealership. Some models are unable to be upgraded, and instead customers will be reimbursed for steering wheel locks.

To settle a class-action lawsuit in the United States against Hyundai and Kia, the two brands agreed to pay about US$200 million, of which up to $145 million would offset out-of-pocket losses that car owners had incurred. The settlement was announced on May 18, 2023, and requires approval by a federal judge. However, it was rejected by federal judge James V. Selna.

== See also ==
- Devious lick, a 2021 internet challenge which encouraged theft and vandalism of school property
