= Anti-hijack system =

Electronic system fitted to motor vehicles to deter criminals from hijacking them

An anti-hijack system is an electronic system fitted to motor vehicles to deter criminals from hijacking them. Although these types of systems are increasingly common on newer cars, they are not as widely known as other more common anti-theft systems such as alarms or steering locks. It may be a part of an alarm or immobiliser system. An approved anti-hijacking system will achieve a safe, quick shutdown of the vehicle it is attached to. There are also mechanical anti-hijack devices.

== Technology ==
There are three basic principles on which the systems work.

=== Lockout ===
A lockout system is armed when the driver turns the ignition key to the on position and carries out a specified action, usually flicking a hidden switch or depressing the brake pedal twice. It is activated when the vehicle drops below a certain speed or becomes stationary, causing all of the vehicle's doors automatically lock to prevent against thieves stealing the vehicle when it is stopped, for example at a traffic light or pedestrian crossing.

=== Transponder ===
A transponder system is a system which is always armed until a device, usually a small RFID transponder, enters the vehicle's transmitter radius. Since the device is carried by the driver, usually in their wallet or pocket, if the driver leaves the immediate vicinity of the vehicle, so will the transponder, causing the system to assume the vehicle has been hijacked and disable it.

As the transponder itself is concealed, the thief would not be aware that such a system is active on a vehicle until they had ejected the driver and moved the vehicle out of range of the driver (usually only a couple of meters). This is probably the most common anti-hijack system, and a central locking system that uses the same concept as keyless entry and ignition systems.

=== Microswitch ===
A microswitch system is always armed and is usually activated if one of the vehicle doors is opened and closed again while the vehicle's engine is running. Once the system has been activated, the driver will have a set time limit to disarm it by entering a code before the vehicle takes measures.

If the system is not disarmed in the time window, it may alert the driver by repeatedly sounding the vehicle's horn at decreasing intervals and will usually activate the vehicle's hazard lights. The system may activate the immobiliser circuit completely disabling the engine and eventually bringing the vehicle to a stop. If the ignition is switched to the off position and back to the on position again, the system may keep the vehicle immobilised with the horn and hazard lights activated until the system is disarmed.

=== Other systems ===
The Blaster was a South African system developed in the 1990s which mounted flamethrowers along the side of the vehicle, activating them if the system was armed and someone attempted to enter the vehicle.

== See also ==
- Immobilisers
- Car alarms
- Vehicle tracking systems
- Anti-theft system
