= Automotive RKE receiver antenna =

Radio antenna on a vehicle for wireless keys

An automotive remote keyless entry (RKE) receiver antenna is a radio-frequency (RF) antenna used in remote keyless entry (RKE) systems in vehicles. RKE systems allow drivers to lock, unlock, and in some cases start the engine wirelessly using a key fob with buttons. These systems typically operate at 315 MHz (primarily in North America) or 433 MHz (Europe and most of the rest of the world).

RKE antennas are present both in the key fob (transmitter) and inside the vehicle (receiver). Their primary function is to provide reliable short- to medium-range wireless communication between the key fob and the vehicle under various environmental conditions, including vehicle body shielding, multipath propagation and electromagnetic interference.

== Main types of RKE antennas ==
Automotive RKE receiver antennas can be broadly classified into printed PCB antennas, discrete conductive antennas, window glass antennas, and RKE antennas integrated into combined multi-antenna systems (shark-fin design).

These antenna types differ in radiation efficiency, bandwidth, sensitivity to the ground plane, and suitability for compact automotive electronics.

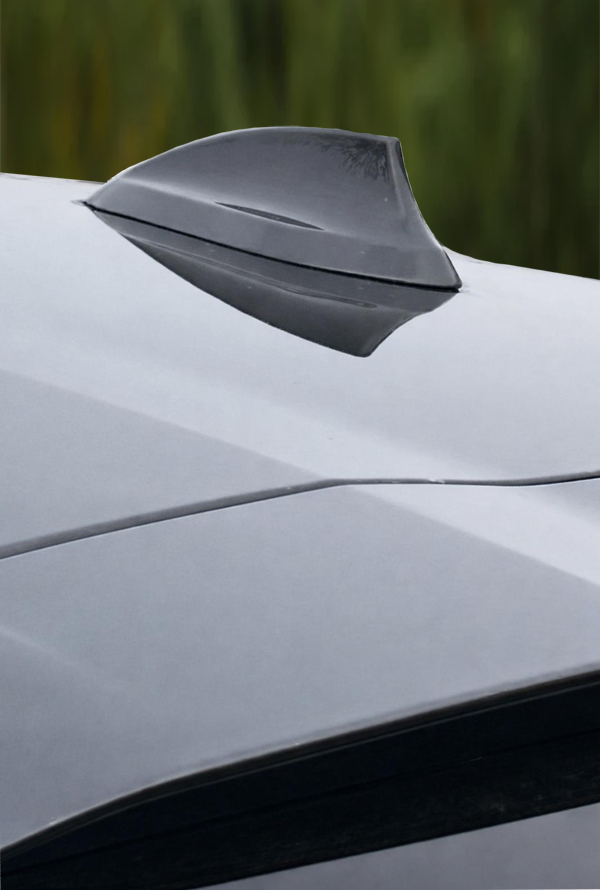
Typical roof-mounted shark-fin multi-antenna module, commonly integrating the RKE receiver antenna with GNSS, cellular, and other systems

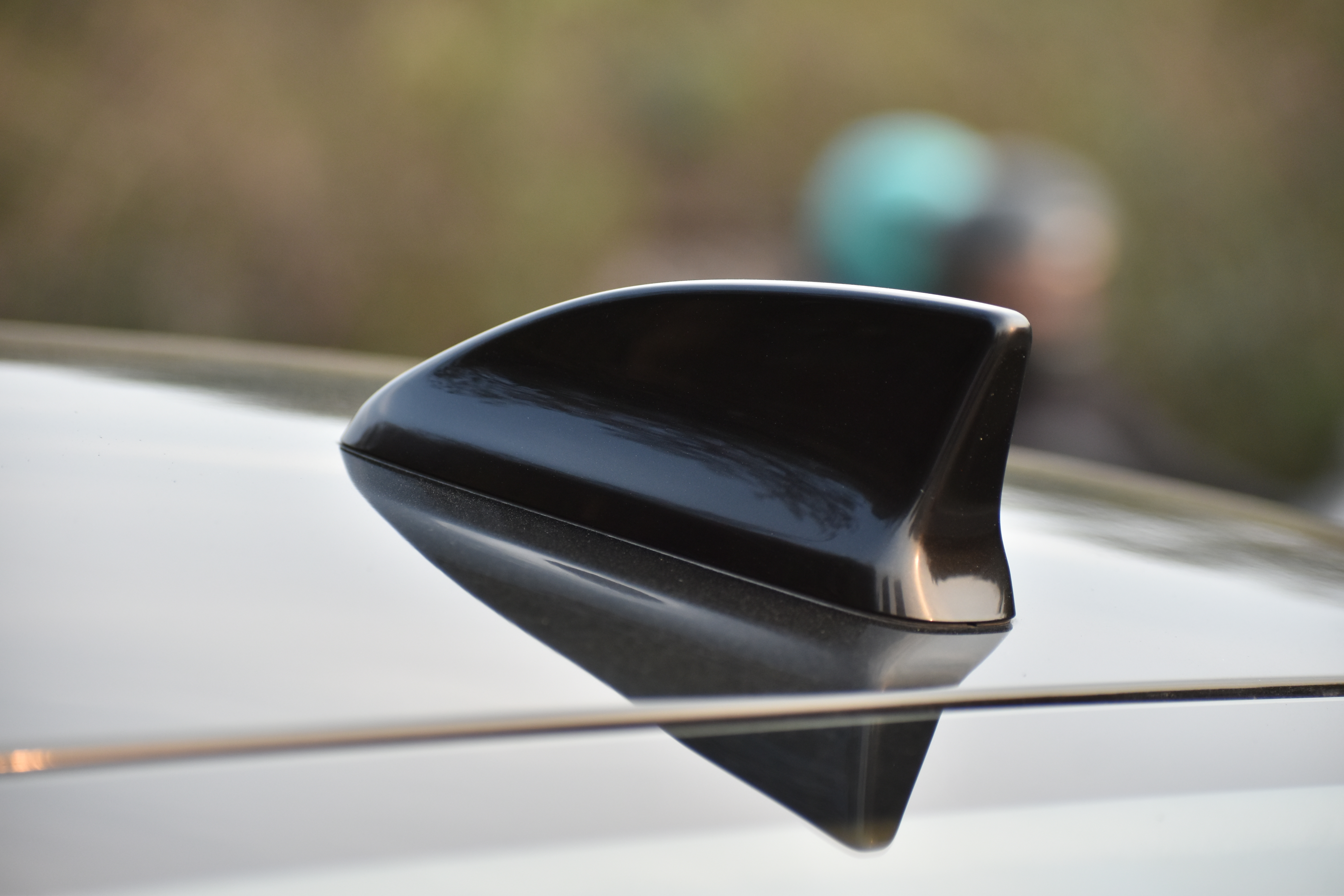
Shark Fin Antenna of Honda City 7th Generation (5th Generation Sedan) iVTEC 2022

== Printed PCB antennas ==
Printed PCB antennas are fabricated directly on a printed circuit board and represent the most common solution for both key-fob transmitters and vehicle-mounted RKE receivers due to their low cost, compact size, and ease of integration.

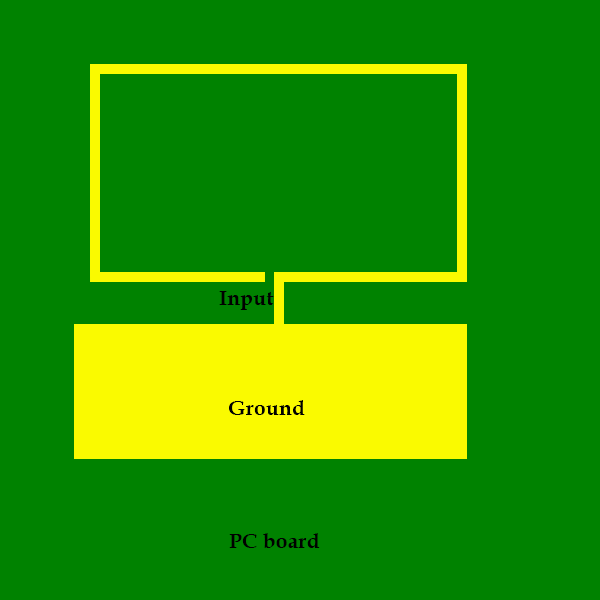
Schematic of a printed loop antenna on PCB, commonly used in early RKE receivers

- Printed loop antennas consist of a closed conductive trace forming a loop on the PCB. They are widely used in early vehicle receivers because of their simplicity and robustness. However, they typically exhibit limited radiation efficiency at sub-GHz frequencies due to their electrically small size.

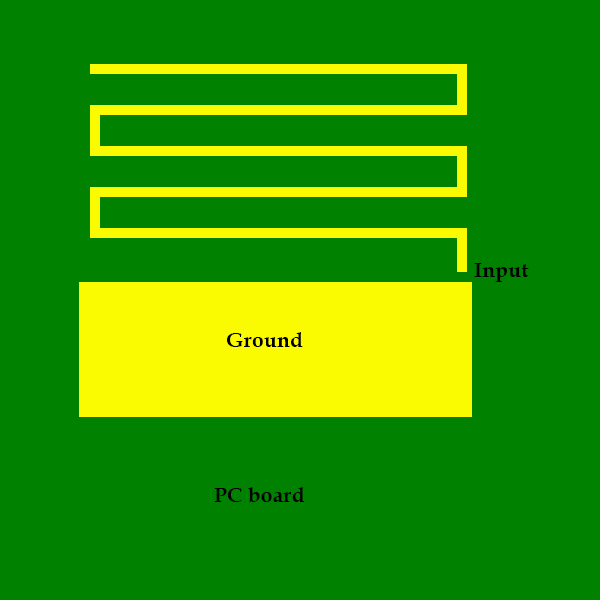
Schematic of a printed meander-line antenna on PCB, widely used in modern compact RKE systems and key-fob designs

- Printed meander-line antennas use folded or zigzag conductive traces to reduce the physical length of the antenna while maintaining electrical resonance. Compared with simple loops, meander-line antennas generally provide higher radiation efficiency and are therefore widely used in modern RKE systems and compact key-fob designs.

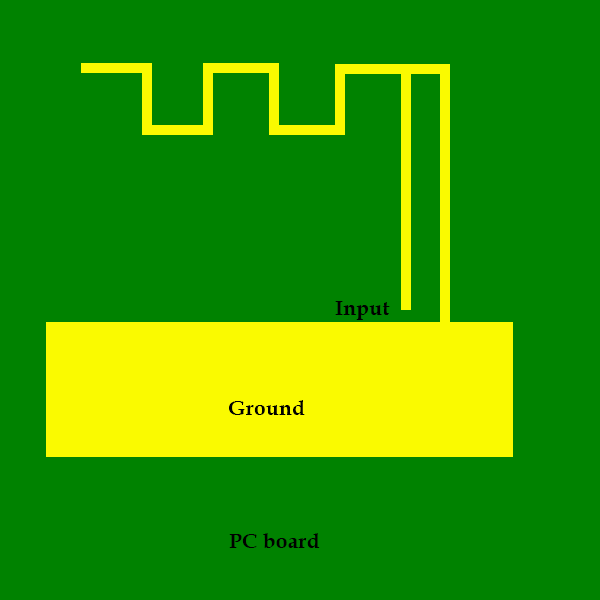
Schematic of a Planar Inverted-F Antenna (PIFA) on PCB, offering improved impedance control

- Planar Inverted-F Antennas (PIFA) are a form of printed PCB antenna in which the radiating element is implemented as a planar conductive plate rather than a thin trace. The plate is connected to the ground plane through a shorting element, forming an “F”-shaped topology in cross-section. PIFA structures provide improved impedance control and reduced sensitivity to nearby components and are used in some vehicle-mounted RKE receivers where sufficient PCB area and a defined ground reference are available.
- Printed monopole and dipole variants are also employed on PCBs where additional board area or a defined ground reference are available. These structures can offer improved radiation performance but are more sensitive to ground-plane geometry and nearby components.

== Discrete conductive antennas ==
Discrete conductive antennas are implemented as separate metallic elements rather than PCB traces.

- Wire antennas use bent wire elements whose geometry is optimized to fit constrained installation volumes such as dashboards, door modules, or bumpers. They offer design flexibility and can provide improved efficiency compared with printed solutions in certain locations.
- Stamped metal antennas are manufactured from stamped conductive parts and are often integrated into mechanical vehicle components. This approach allows robust integration while maintaining acceptable radiation characteristics at 315 MHz and 433 MHz.

== RKE receiving antennas as part of combined multi-antenna systems ==
In modern vehicles, RKE antennas are increasingly implemented as part of combined multi-antenna systems, in which several antennas supporting different wireless services are integrated into a single module or coordinated antenna architecture.

The RKE antenna operates alongside antennas for GNSS, cellular (LTE/5G), Wi-Fi, Bluetooth, and V2X systems. A common implementation is the roof-mounted “shark-fin” module, where multiple antennas are packaged together to reduce cabling complexity and improve vehicle aesthetics.

The RKE function within a combined system may be realized using printed PCB antennas, PIFA structures, or compact discrete conductive elements. Careful electromagnetic design is required to manage mutual coupling, detuning effects, and noise coupling between co-located antennas.

In some architectures, RKE antennas in combined systems are implemented as active antennas with integrated low-noise amplifiers (LNAs) to compensate for reduced antenna efficiency and additional losses.

== Polarization and radiation characteristics ==
Most RKE antennas are designed for linear polarization. While some implementations use vertical polarization, others employ horizontal or slanted polarization based on packaging requirements.

A significant challenge is the random orientation of the key fob in the user's hand, leading to polarization mismatch loss, and the "hand effect" where human tissue detunes and absorbs RF energy. Magnetic-field radiators like loop antennas are more robust against this effect than electric-field radiators like monopoles.

== Antenna locations and antenna diversity ==
Modern vehicles employ multiple RKE receiving antennas distributed throughout the vehicle body to achieve near-omnidirectional coverage.

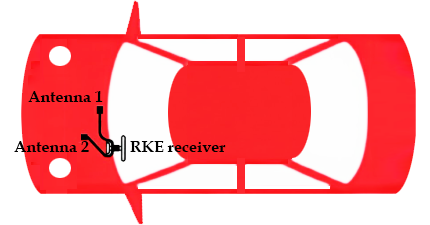
Diagram showing typical locations of multiple RKE receiver antennas on a vehicle to achieve spatial diversity and mitigate multipath fading

Typical locations include headliner (roof area), front and rear bumpers, door handles, B-pillars, interior trim panels, mirrors, and window glass.

The metallic vehicle body causes significant multipath fading. To mitigate this, manufacturers use antenna diversity systems — typically spatial or polarization diversity. The RKE receiver monitors signal strength (RSSI) from each antenna and selects the strongest signal.

== Operating range and passive/active antenna configurations ==
RKE systems typically provide an operating range of 10–50 metres, with some reaching up to 100 metres under optimal conditions.

- Passive antennas are integrated directly into the Body Control Module or dedicated unit, commonly as PCB trace or helical designs. They are cost-effective but susceptible to detuning by the metal chassis.
- Active antennas include an integrated LNA and are placed in RF-transparent areas (roof spoiler, mirrors). They use phantom powering over the coaxial cable to extend range.

== See also ==
- Remote keyless system
- Key fob
- Inverted-F antenna
- Antenna diversity
- Smart key
- Automotive electronics
