= Hot-wiring =

Process of starting an automobile by bypassing the ignition lock

Hot-wiring is a method of bypassing a motor vehicle's ignition switch and thus starting it without the key. It is often utilized in motor vehicle theft. However, a legitimate vehicle owner who has lost a vehicle key or is starting a vehicle with an inoperable ignition switch (e.g. in run-down old cars) may also use the process.

== Methods ==
Hot-wiring generally involves connecting the wires which complete the circuit when the key is in the "on" or "run" position, which turns on the fuel pump, ignition system and other necessary components, then touching another wire that connects to the starter. The specific method of hot-wiring a vehicle is dependent on the particular vehicle's electrical ignition system. Remote start units access the same wires as conventional ignition methods. Listings of wire colors and locations and ignition system schematics may sometimes be found in Internet databases.

Cars and trucks produced before the 21st century, which often have a carbureted engine, a manual transmission, and a single ignition coil and distributor, can be hot-wired from the engine bay. Using standard lock picking to start a more modern vehicle is now usually ineffective with the advent of immobilisers, transponder verification, and smart key systems. Conversely, most types of motorcycles are often easier to hot-wire, especially scooters and older naked bikes, which lack advanced security features beyond mechanical locks and conventional ignition switch.

== See also ==
- Immobiliser
