= Immobiliser =

Motor vehicle anti-theft device

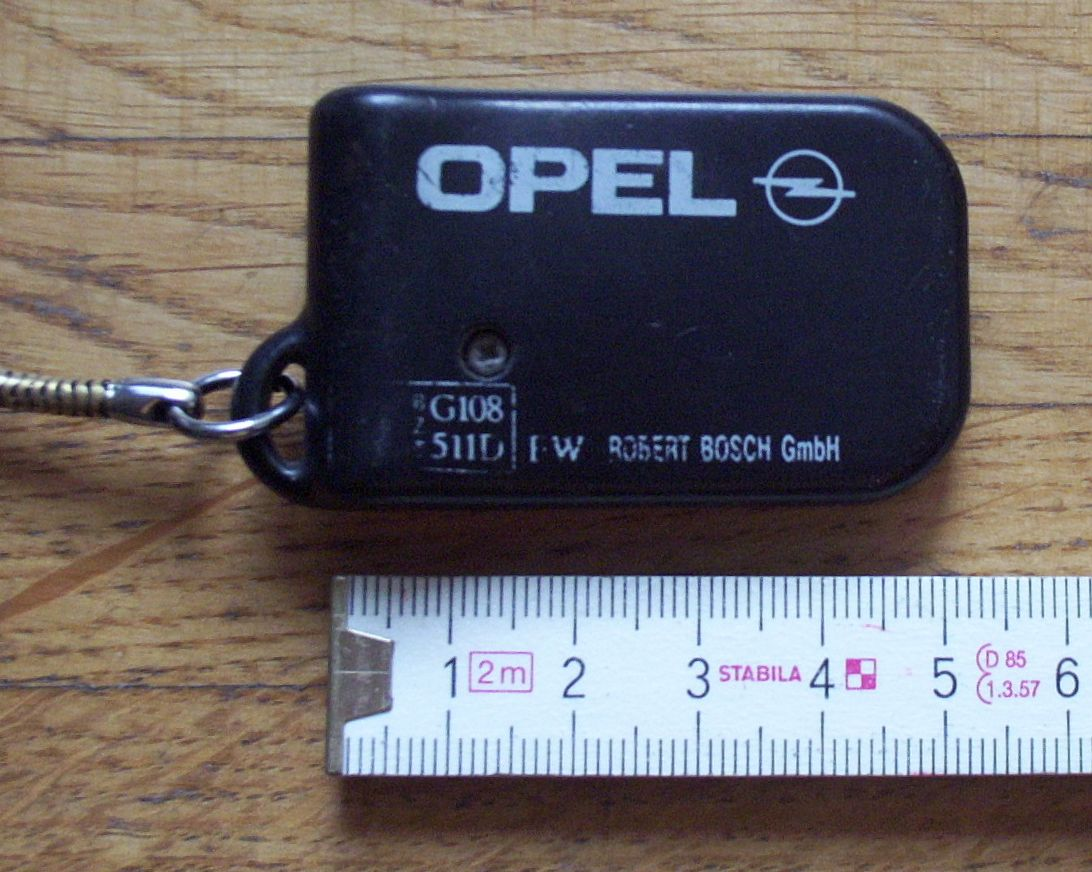
The remote of a first-generation immobiliser

Immobiliser sign

Vehicle Immobilizer Active light in a Suzuki Vehicle.

An immobiliser or immobilizer is an electronic security device fitted to a motor vehicle that prevents the engine from being started unless the correct key (transponder or smart key) is present. This prevents the vehicle from being "hot-wired" after entry has been achieved and thus reduces motor vehicle theft. Research shows that the uniform application of immobilisers reduced the rate of car theft by 40%.

== Description ==
The electric immobiliser/alarm system was invented by St. George Evans and Edward Birkenbeuel and patented in 1919. They developed a 3×3 grid of double-contact switches on a panel mounted inside the car so when the ignition switch was activated, current from the battery (or magneto) went to the spark plugs allowing the engine to start, or immobilizing the vehicle and sounding the horn. The system settings could be changed each time the car was driven. Modern immobiliser systems are automatic, meaning the owner does not have to remember to activate it.

Early models used a static code in the ignition key (or key fob) which was recognised by an RFID loop (transponder) around the lock barrel and checked against the vehicle's engine control unit (ECU) for a match. If the code is unrecognised, the ECU will not allow fuel to flow and ignition to take place.

Later models use rolling codes or advanced cryptography to defeat copying of the code from the key or ECU (smart key).

The microcircuit inside the key is activated by a small electromagnetic field which induces current to flow inside the key body, which in turn broadcasts a unique binary code, which is read by the automobile's ECU. When the ECU determines that the coded key is both current and valid, the ECU activates the fuel-injection sequence.

In some vehicles, attempts to use an unauthorised or "non-sequenced" key cause the vehicle to activate a timed "no-start condition" and in some highly advanced systems, even use satellite or mobile phone communication to alert a security firm that an unauthorised attempt was made to code a key.

Coincidentally, this information is often recorded in modern automobile ECUs as part of their on-board diagnostics, which may record many other variables including speed, temperature, driver weight, geographic location, throttle position and yaw angle. This information can be used during insurance investigations, warranty claims or technical troubleshooting.

== Regulation ==
Immobilisers have been mandatory in all new cars sold in Germany since 1 January 1998, in the United Kingdom since 1 October 1998, in Finland since 1998, and in Australia since 2001.

In September 2007, a Transport Canada regulation mandated the installation of engine immobilisers in all new lightweight vehicles and trucks manufactured in Canada.

== Availability by car brand ==
Honda was the first motorcycle manufacturer to include immobilisers on its products in the 1990s. Add-on immobilisers are available for older cars or vehicles that do not come equipped with factory immobilisers. The insurance approval for a self-arming immobiliser is known as "Thatcham 2" after the Motor Insurance Repair Research Centre in Thatcham, England. Approved immobilisers must intercept at least two circuits: typically the low-voltage ignition circuit and the fuel pump circuit. Some may also intercept the low-current starter motor circuit from the key switch to the relay.

Lack of immobilizers in many Kia and Hyundai U.S. models after 2010 and before mid-2021 made these cars targets for theft in the early 2020s, especially in Milwaukee County, Wisconsin and Columbus, Ohio. The Kia Challenge TikTok trend was linked to a series of Hyundai/Kia vehicle thefts in 2022.

== Cracking ==
Numerous vulnerabilities have been found in the immobilisers designed to protect modern cars from theft. Many vehicle immobilisers use the Megamos chip, which has been proven to be crackable. The Megamos transponder is one of many different transponders found in today's immobiliser systems and also comes in many different versions. Hacking of an immobiliser in the real world would be performed on the vehicle, not on the key. It would be faster to program a new key to the vehicle than to try to clone the existing key, especially on modern vehicles.

Some immobiliser systems tend to remember the last key code for so long that they may even accept a non-transponder key, even after the original key has been removed from the ignition for a few minutes.

== Effectiveness ==
A 2016 study in the Economic Journal found that the immobiliser lowered the overall rate of car theft by about 40% between 1995 and 2008. The benefits in terms of prevented thefts were at least three times higher than the costs of installing the device.

== See also ==
- Anti-theft system
- Anti-hijack system
- Ignition interlock device
- Vehicle Theft Protection Program
- Remote keyless system
- Key (lock)
