= NFSR =

NFSR may refer to:

- National Fund for Scientific Research, a former government institution in Belgium
- Need for Speed: Rivals, a 2013 racing video game
- Nonlinear feedback shift register, common component in modern stream ciphers
