= SecuriLock =

Proprietary anti-theft mechanism for auto-vehicles

SecuriLock, also known as Passive Anti-Theft System (PATS), is an immobilizer technology that Ford began using in select Ford, as well as Lincoln and Mercury models. Each key has a radio frequency transponder embedded in the plastic head with a unique electronic identification code.

== Operation ==
When the a key is inserted and turned to start the vehicle, the on-board computer sends out an RF signal which is picked up by the transponder in the key. In less than one second, the transponder then returns a unique RF signal to the vehicle's computer, giving confirmation to start and continue to run. If the on-board computer does not receive the correct identification code, certain components, such as the fuel pump and the starter, will remain disabled.

== Replacement keys ==
Replacement keys, which can be purchased through the dealer or a 3rd party, must be compatible with the vehicle. Before the key can be used to start the vehicle it must be programmed by inserting the original key(s) as well as the new key into the ignition.

With PATS I, programming of a new key can be done with just one working key. With PATS II, two working keys are required for reprogramming. This helped ensure that only the owner of the vehicle can make duplicate keys. If a second working key is not available programming will need to be performed by the dealer.

== History ==
For the 1999 model year, all Ford Motor Company vehicles equipped with the Passive Anti-Theft System use the PATS II system. The PATS II system was introduced on roughly half of the PATS equipped vehicles for the 1998 model year. The other half of the PATS equipped vehicles for the 1998 model year were equipped with the PATS I system. Many 2000 and later Ford vehicles use the E-PATS system, which uses an encrypted transponder in the key.

== List of equipped vehicles ==
PATS I equipped vehicles include the following.

- 1998 Contour V6 Duratec
- 1997-1998 Expedition
- 1997 Mark VIII
- 1996-1997 Mustang
- 1998 Mystique LS
- 1997-1998 Navigator
- 1996-1997 Sable (Not all were included.)
- 1996-1997 Taurus LX and SHO

PATS II equipped vehicles include the following:

- 2003-2005 Aviator
- 2002-2003 Blackwood
- 1998-2002 Continental
- 1999-2000 Contour V6
- 1999-2002 Cougar
- 1998-2006 Crown Victoria
- 2001-2013 Escape
- 1999-2006 Expedition
- 1998-2007 Explorer
- 2000-2005 Excursion
- 1999-2014 F150 and F250 LD
- 2010 Ford Figo
- 2005-2007 Five-Hundred
- 2000-2007 Focus
- 2004–present Freestar
- 2005–present Freestyle
- 2006–present Fusion
- 1998-2006 Grand Marquis
- 2005-2006 GT
- 1999-2006 LS6 and LS8
- 2006 Mark LT
- 1997-1998 Mark VIII
- 2003-2004 Marauder
- 2005-2006 Mariner
- 2006 Milan
- 2005-2006 Montego
- 2004-2006 Monterey
- 1998-2007 Mountaineer
- 1998-2007 Mustang
- 1999-2000 Mystique LS
- 1999-2006 Navigator
- 1999-2004 Ranger V6 (In 2006, all Rangers were included.)
- 1998-2005 Sable
- 2006-2019 Taurus
- 1998-2006 Taurus LX, SE, and SHO
- 2002-2005 Thunderbird
- 1998-2006 Town Car
- 1999-2004 Windstar
- 2006 Zephyr/MKZ
