= Car key =

Key used to open and/or start an automobile

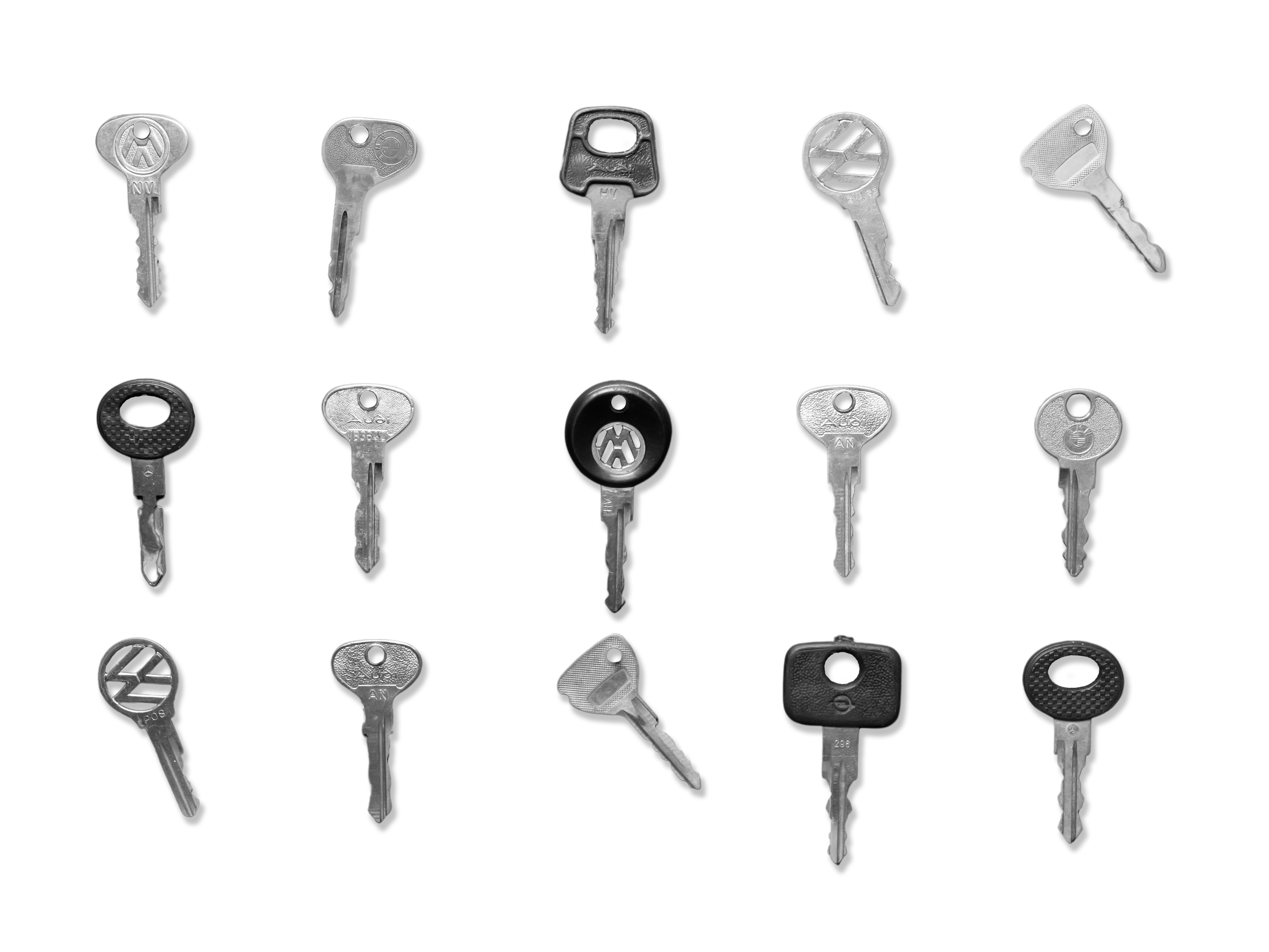
Car keys of different German cars from the 1970s/80s

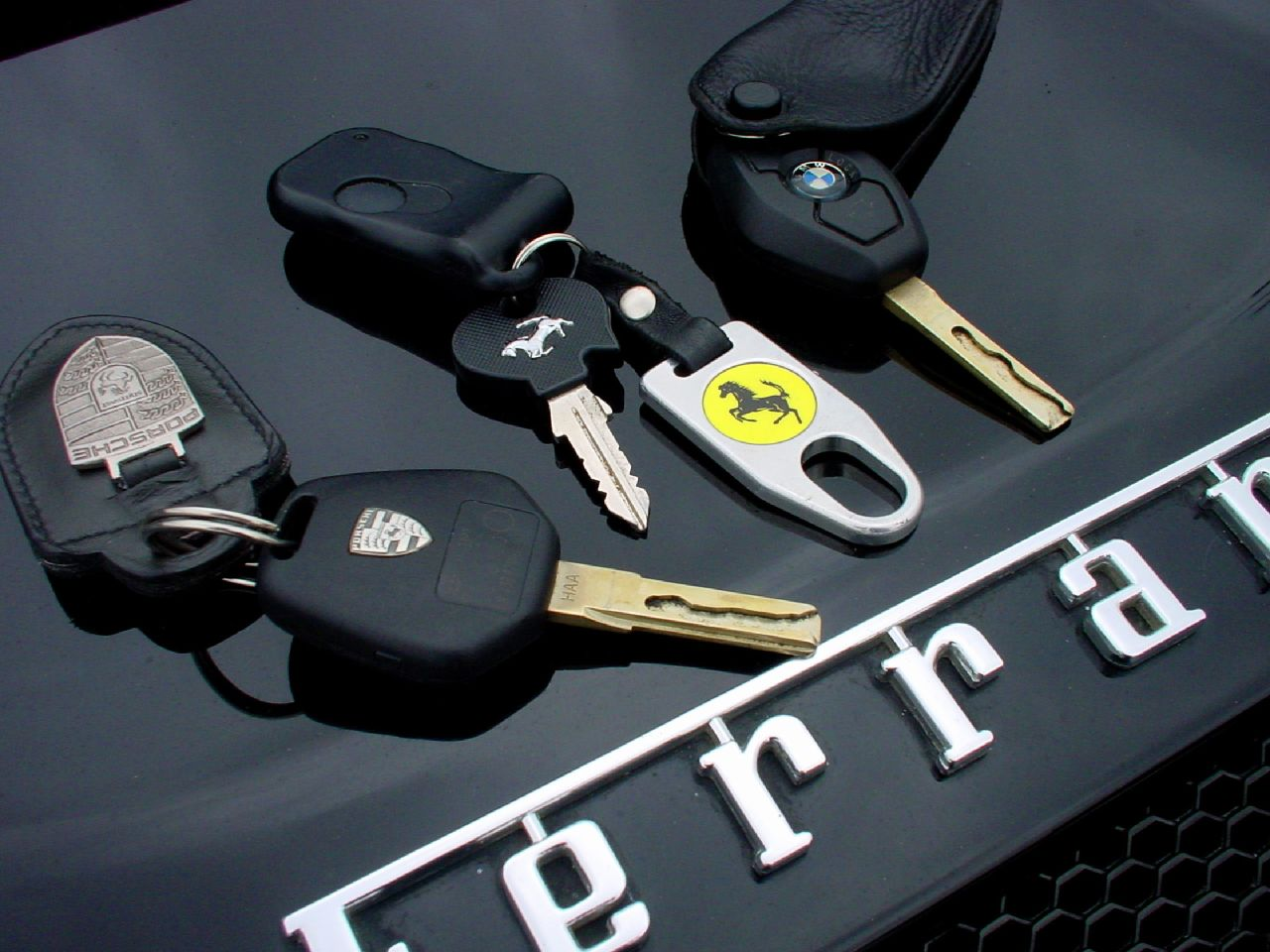
Car keys of different manufacturers

Car key in ignition

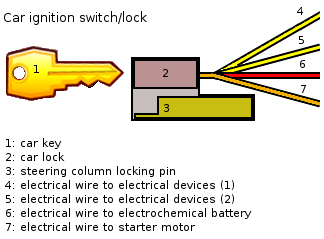
Car ignition and steering wheel lock

A car key or an automobile key is a key used to open and/or start an automobile. Modern key designs are usually symmetrical, and some use grooves on both sides, rather than a cut edge, to actuate the lock. It has multiple uses for the automobile with which it was sold. A car key can open the doors, as well as start the ignition, open the glove compartment and also open the trunk (boot) of the car. Some cars come with an additional key known as a valet key that starts the ignition and opens the driver's side door, but prevents the valet from gaining access to valuables that are located in the trunk or the glove box. Some valet keys, particularly those to high-performance vehicles, go so far as to restrict the engine's power output to prevent joyriding. Recently, features such as coded immobilizers have been implemented in newer vehicles. More sophisticated systems make ignition dependent on electronic device, rather than the mechanical keyswitch. A number of these systems, such as KeeLoq and Megamos Crypto have been demonstrated to be weak and vulnerable to cryptanalytic attacks.

Ignition switches or locks are combined with security locking of the steering column (in many modern vehicles) or the gear lever (such as in Saab Automobile vehicles). In the latter, the switch is between the seats, preventing damage to the driver's knee in the event of a collision.

Keyless entry systems, which use a door-mounted keypad, key fob, a wireless-enabled handheld computing device (e.g., smartphone or tablet), or a remote control in place of a toothed key, have become a standard feature on most new cars. Some of them are handsfree in that a vehicle door is automatically unlocked when the user's handheld device is detected within proximity to the vehicle.

Some high-tech automotive keys are billed as theft deterrents. Mercedes-Benz uses a key that, rather than have a cut metal piece to start the car, uses an encoded infrared beam that communicates with the car's computer. If the codes match, the car can be started. These keys can be expensive to replace if lost and can cost up to US $400.

A switchblade key is basically the same as any other car key, except in appearance. The switchblade key is designed to fold away inside the fob when it is not being used. Switchblade keys have become very popular recently because of their smart compact look. These types of keys are also commonly referred to as "flip keys." Because switchblade keys are only developed for new car models, they are usually equipped with a programmed transponder chip.

== History ==
Very early automobiles had no doors, and thus no locking mechanism or keys whatsoever. By 1904, cars had doors, beginning with the Oldsmobile Model R, and by 1908, door keys were introduced on the Buick Model 10, but ignition was still done via cranking. In 1910, engine keys were introduced but only locked the car's electric circuitry. Car-starting was still done with cranking, or later on in the 1920s, by pressing a button.

The first ignition keys that also operated the starter mechanism were introduced by Chrysler in 1949. Popular Mechanics, in April 1949, wrote:

Among the innovations of primary interest to the driver is the combination ignition and starter switch which eliminates the starter button. The car starts by turning the ignition key slightly beyond the 'ignition on' position. When released, the key automatically returns to 'ignition on'. Aside from the convenience to the driver, this starter makes it impossible for children to move a car which has been left in gear by pushing the starter button.

In the 1950s, early versions of "flip keys" resembling jackknives were made by the Signa-Craft company out of New York with various period U.S. automaker's prototype dream cars like the Pontiac Strato-Streak and the Cadillac El Camino featured on them .

Signa-Craft and other manufacturers like Curtis, Taylor Locks, and Mr. Key also produced keys for many 1950s-1970s makes and models known as "crest keys." These were automotive keys that featured an enameled rendition of the auto manufacturer's logo on the bow and were plated in 14k gold. During the early 1960s, these special keys became so popular that oil companies like Mobil, Texaco, and Union 76 began issuing their own logoed versions as promotional items for their customers.

Meanwhile, companies like Briggs and Stratton and Hurd were making key blanks with automakers' logos on them. These became known as "logo blanks." These key blanks were the same as the original keys issued by the automaker and allowed the owner to purchase duplicate keys identical to the original.

=== Car enthusiast shows ===
Car enthusiasts, who enter competitive car shows, attempt to maintain the stock look of their car keys. Picky car show judges will often score a vehicle down for not having a correct set of keys with the original automaker's logo, and lock cod, stamped on them. Many of these original logo blanks are no longer manufactured and are only available from dwindling old stock supplies.

== Types ==
=== Internal cut ===
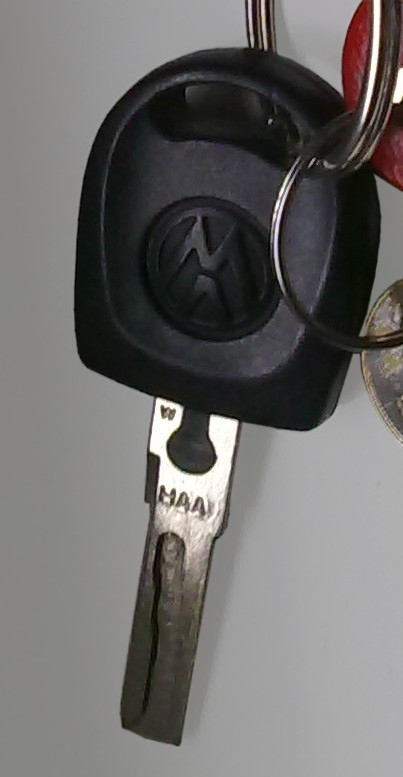
Internal-cut key from a Volkswagen automobile

An internal cut (also known as "sidewinder" or "laser cut") key has a rectangular blade with a wavy groove cut up the center of the face of the blade, at a constant depth.

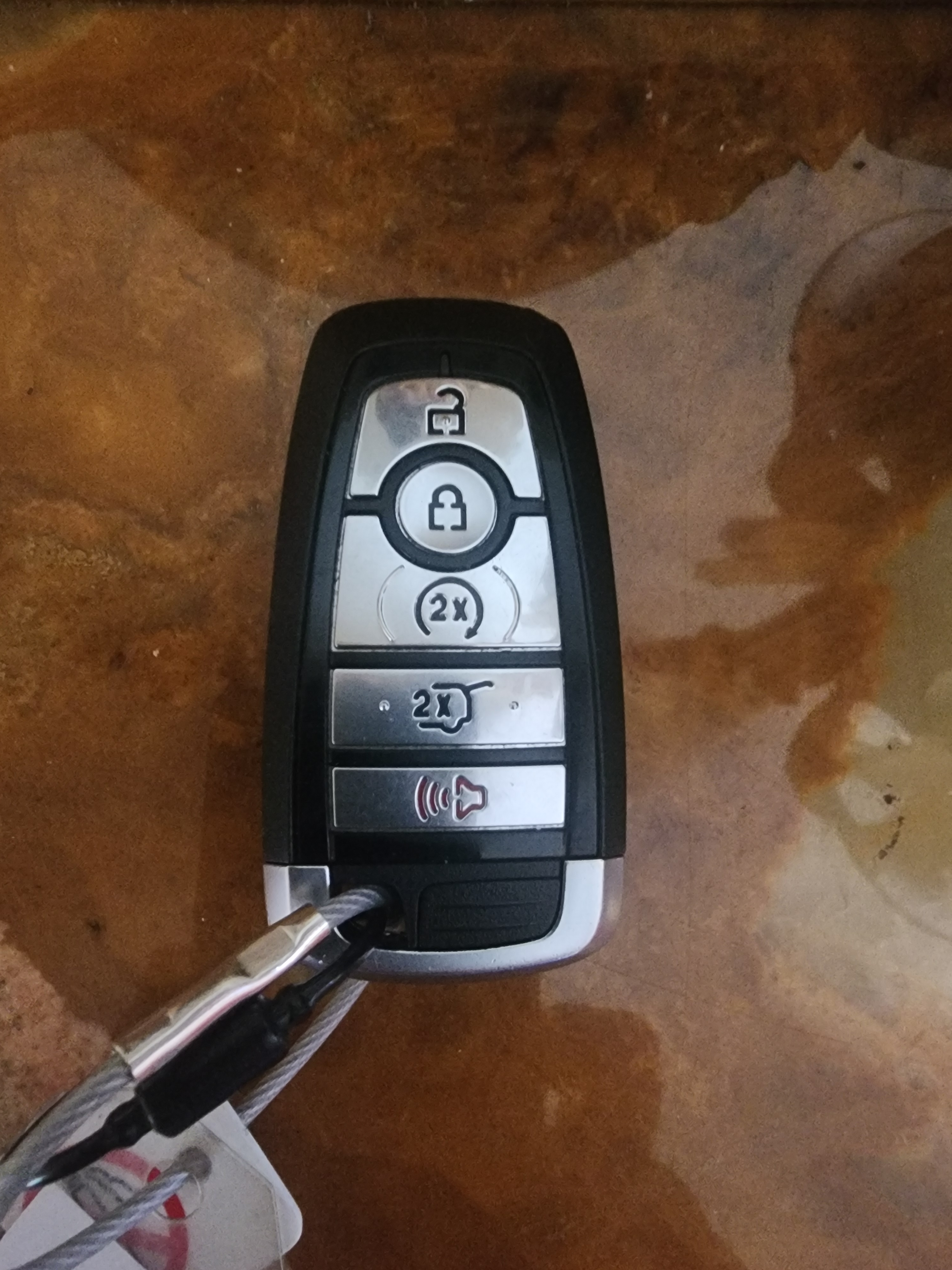
A 2024 Ford Escape Platinum transponder car key.

Typically the key has an identical wavy groove on the back of the blade, making it symmetrical so it works no matter which way it is inserted. These keys must be cut by special key cutting machines made for them.

=== Transponder ===
Transponder keys may also be called "chip keys". Transponder keys are automotive ignition keys with signal-emitting circuits built inside.

When the key is turned in the ignition cylinder, the car's computer transmits a radio signal to the transponder circuit. The circuit has no battery; it is energized by the radio signal itself. The circuit typically has a computer chip that is programmed to respond by sending a coded signal back to the car's computer. If the circuit does not respond or if the code is incorrect, the engine will not start. Many cars are immobilized if the wrong key is used by intruders. Chip keys successfully protect cars from theft in two ways: forcing the ignition cylinder will not start the car, and the keys are difficult to duplicate. This is why chip keys are popular in modern cars and help decrease car theft. Transponder keys are prone to damage if used and stored incorrectly. They should not be exposed to electrical impulses, humidity, or direct sunlight. Many manufacturers, owners, and locksmiths recommend being particularly careful with keeping them with objects that might cause mechanical damage too. In case of breakage, an owner may get a new key in two ways—from their car dealership or using automotive locksmith services. Both methods are equally effective and reliable.

Many people who have transponder keys, such as those that are part of Ford Motor Company's SecuriLock system, are not aware of the fact because the circuit is hidden inside the plastic head of the key. On the other hand, General Motors produced what are known as VATS keys (Vehicle Anti-Theft System) during the 1990s, which are often erroneously believed to be transponders but actually use a simple resistor, which is visible in the blade of the key. If the electrical resistance of the resistor is wrong, or the key is a normal key without a resistor, the circuit of the car's electrical system will not allow the engine to get started.

== See also ==
- Power door locks
