= Carjacking =

Crime of stealing a car from a victim by force

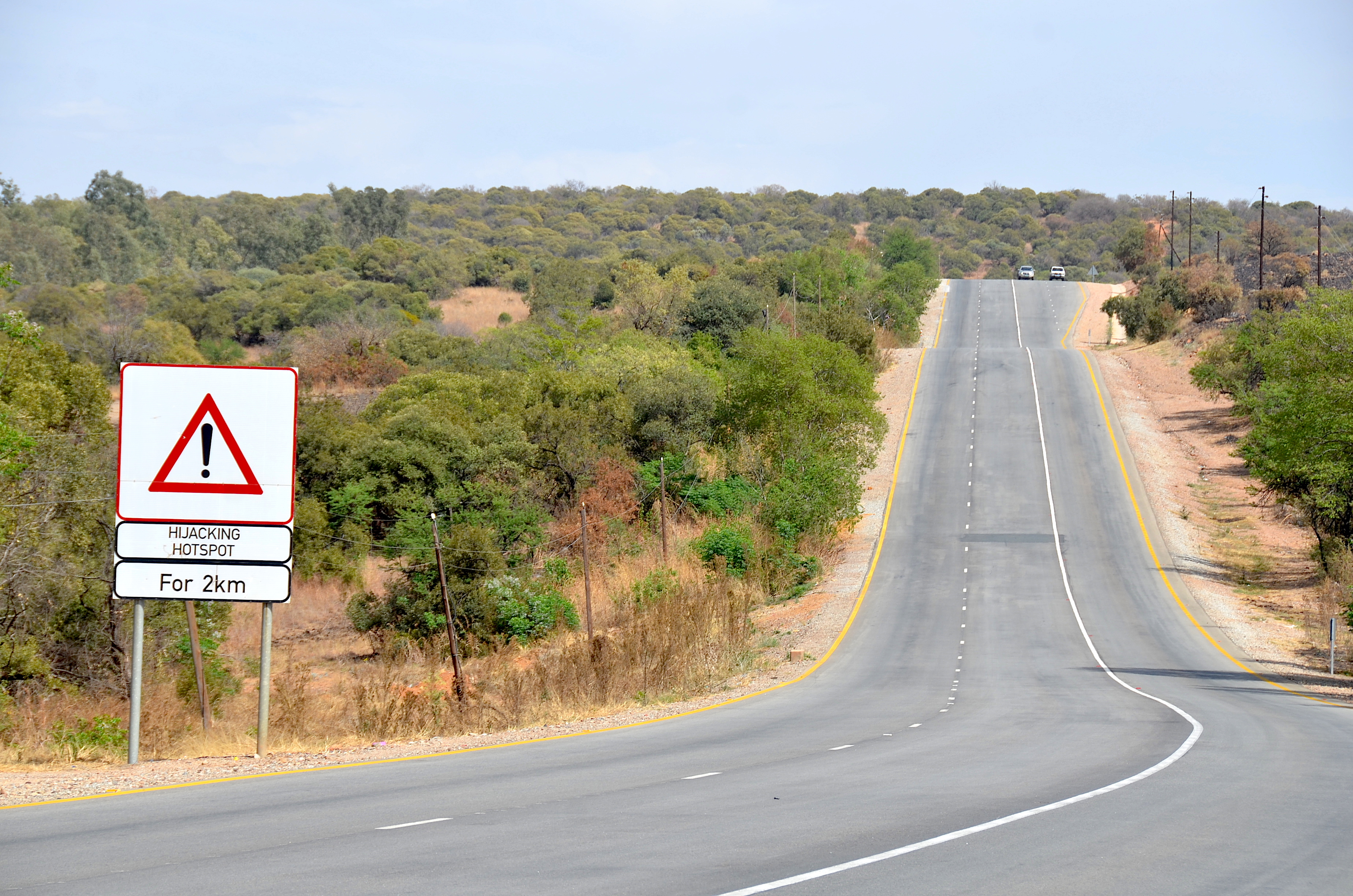
A sign warning of carjacking activities along a stretch of road in Gauteng, South Africa

Carjacking is a robbery in which a motor vehicle is taken over. In contrast to car theft, carjacking is usually in the presence and knowledge of the victim. A common crime in many places in the world, carjacking has been the subject of legislative responses, criminology studies, prevention efforts as well as being heavily dramatized in major film releases. Commercial vehicles such as trucks and armored cars containing valuable cargo are common targets of carjacking attempts. Carjacking usually involves physical violence to the victim, or using the victim as a hostage. In rare cases, carjacking may also involve sexual assault.

== Etymology ==
The word is a portmanteau of car and hijacking. The term was coined by reporter Scott Bowles and editor E. J. Mitchell with The Detroit News in 1991. The News first used the term in a report on the murder of Ruth Wahl, a 22-year-old Detroit drugstore cashier who was killed when she would not surrender her Suzuki Sidekick, and in an investigative report examining the rash of what Detroit Police call "robbery armed unlawful driving away an automobile" (in dispatch slang shortened to R.A.-YOU-Da) plaguing Detroit.

The act of carjacking was widespread long before the invention of the term itself, having previously been categorized simply as robbery.

== Studies ==
A study published in the British Journal of Criminology in 2003 found that "for all of the media attention it has received in the United States, Europe and elsewhere, carjacking remains an under-researched and poorly understood crime." The authors conducted semi-structured interviews with 28 active carjackers in St. Louis, Missouri, and concluded that carjacking by their interviewees was motivated by the 'street life' emphasis on "spontaneity, hedonism, the ostentatious display of wealth, and the maintenance of honour."

A study published in the Journal of Contemporary Ethnography in 2013 noted that "carjacking requires offenders to neutralize victims who are inherently mobile and who can use their vehicles as both weapons and shields." The study noted that carjackers use fear to compel compliance from victims.

A 2008 paper by the Australian Institute of Criminology conceptualized carjackings as falling into four types based on method and motive: organized and instrumental, organized and acquisitive, opportunistic and instrumental, and opportunistic and acquisitive. An example of an organized and instrumental carjacking is a planned carjacking with a weapon to use the vehicle for ramming an ATM to steal cash. An example of an organized and acquisitive carjacking is a planned carjacking to sell the vehicle in a known market. An example of an opportunistic and instrumental carjacking is a carjacking without a weapon to sell "vehicle/parts with no market in mind." An example of an opportunistic and acquisitive carjacking is a carjacking without a weapon to joyride.

A 2017 qualitative study published in Justice Quarterly examined auto theft and carjacking in the context of "sanction threats" that promoted fear and influenced "crime preferences" among criminals, thereby redirecting ("channeling") criminal activity. The study showed that "auto thieves are reluctant to embrace the violence of carjacking due to concerns over sanction threat severity they attributed to carjacking—both formal (higher sentences) and informal (victim resistance and retaliation). Meanwhile, the carjackers are reticent to enact auto theft because of the more uncertain and putatively greater risk of being surprised by victims, a fear that appears to overcome the enhanced long-term formal penalty of taking a vehicle by force."

== Prevention and response ==
Common carjacking ruses include: (1) bumping the victim's vehicle from behind, and taking the car when the victim gets out of the vehicle to assess damage and exchange information; (2) staging a fake car accident, sometimes with injuries, and stealing the vehicle of a passerby who stops to assist; (3) flashing lights or waving to get the victim's attention, indicating that there is a problem with the victim's car, and then taking the car once the victim pulls over; and (4) following a victim home, blocking the victim's car in a driveway or in front of a gate.

Police departments, security agencies, and auto insurers have published lists of strategies for preventing and responding to carjackings. Common recommendations include:

- Staying alert and being aware of one's surroundings
- Parking in well-lit areas
- Keeping vehicle doors locked and windows up
- Avoiding unfamiliar or high-crime areas
- Alerting police as soon as is safely possible following a carjacking
- Avoiding isolated and less-well-trafficked parking lots, ATMs, pay phones, etc.
- When stopped in traffic, keeping some distance between the vehicle in front, so one can pull away easily if necessary.
- Using the vehicle to ram the carjacker to avoid being confronted in the vehicle; if confronted, it is often safer to give up the vehicle and avoid resisting

== Truck carjacking ==
Commercial vehicles such as trucks and armored cars may be targets of carjacking attempts. Such carjackings may be aimed at stealing cargo, such as liquor, cigarettes, valuable goods, consumer electronics or even drugs. In other cases, a carjacked truck may be used to commit another crime, such as robbery or a terrorist attack.

Knowledge of the location of a truck carrying valuable cargo often requires inside information, and sometimes truck drivers collude with truck carjackers to facilitate the truck carjacking. This crime is often perpetuated by organized crime operations or by career criminals, or by a collaboration between the two. In particular, La Cosa Nostra has been known to orchestrate the carjacking of trucks at locations such as Kennedy Airport in which a truck driver under Mafia influence allows carjackers to steal the truck.

== Incidents by country ==
=== Argentina ===
Carjacking has been a common problem in Argentina, it is known there as piratería del asfalto (road piracy).

=== South Africa ===
Carjacking is a significant problem in South Africa, where it is called hijacking. South Africa is thought to have the highest carjacking rate in the world. There were 16,000 reported carjackings in 1998. The figures dropped to 12,434 reported carjackings in 2005, and continued to drop until 2011 to 2012, when the number of carjackings was 9,475, a record low. Subsequently, however, carjackings increased as part of an overall increase in violent organized crime, which the Institute for Security Studies attributed to poor police leadership. There were 11,221 reported carjackings in 2014. More than half of all carjackings in South Africa occurred in Gauteng province, which includes Johannesburg and Pretoria.

The carjacking issue in South Africa was depicted in the 2005 film Tsotsi, which won the Academy Award for Best Foreign Language Film.

In the late 1990s and early 2000s, several new, unconventional anti-carjacking systems designed to harm the attacker were developed and marketed in South Africa, where carjacking had become endemic. Among these was the now defunct Blaster, a small flame-thrower that could be mounted to the underside of a vehicle.

=== United States ===
==== Federal Anti-Car Theft Act of 1992 ====
In 1992, Congress, in the aftermath of a spate of violent carjackings (including some in which the victims were murdered), passed the Federal Anti-Car Theft Act of 1992 (FACTA), the first federal carjacking law, making it a federal crime (punishable by 15 years to life imprisonment) to use a firearm to steal "through force or violence or intimidation" a motor vehicle that had been shipped through interstate commerce. The 1992 Act, codified at 18 U.S.C. § 2119, took effect on October 25, 1992. However, only a small number of federal prosecutions were imposed for carjacking the year after the act was enacted, in part because many federal carjacking cases were turned over to state prosecutions because they do not meet U.S. Department of Justice criteria. The Federal Death Penalty Act, part of the Violent Crime Control and Law Enforcement Act of 1994, an omnibus crime bill, made sixty new federal crimes punishable by the federal death penalty; among these were the killing of a victim in the commission of carjacking.

Throughout 1993, articles about carjackings appeared at the rate of more than one a week in newspapers throughout the country. The November 29, 1992, killing of two Osceola County, Florida, men by carjackers using a stolen 9 mm pistol resulted in the first federal prosecution of a fatal carjacking.

==== Prevalence and statistical analysis ====
According to the National Crime Victimization Survey (NCVS) conducted by the U.S. Department of Justice's Bureau of Justice Statistics, from 1993 to 2002, some 38,000 carjackings occurred annually. According to the survey, over this time period men were more often victims than women, blacks more than whites, and Hispanics more than non-Hispanics. 56% of carjackers were identified by victims as black, 21% white, 16% Asian or Native American, and 7% mixed race or unknown. Some 93% of carjackings occurred in urban areas.

There were multiple carjackers in 56% of incidents, and the carjacker or carjackers were identified as male in 93% of incidents. A weapon was used in 74% of carjacking victimization: firearms in 45%, knives in 11%, and other weapons in 18%. Victims were injured in about 32% of completed carjackings and about 17% of attempted carjackings. Serious injuries, such as gunshot or knife wounds, broken bones, or internal injuries occurred in about 9% of incidents. About 14 murders a year involved car theft, but not all of these were carjackings. Some 68% of carjackings occurred at nighttime hours (6 p.m. to 6 a.m.). Some 98% of completed carjackings and 77% of attempted carjackings were reported to police. About 44% of carjacking incidents occurred in an open area (e.g., on the street or near public transportation) while 24% occurred in parking lots or garages or near commercial places (e.g., stores, gas stations, office buildings, restaurants/bars).

According to the NCVS, from 1992 and 1996, about 49,000 completed or attempted nonfatal carjackings took place each year in the United States. The carjacking was successful in about half of the incidents. Data on fatal carjackings are not available; "about 27 homicides by strangers each year involved automobile theft," but not all of these were carjackings.

==== In particular cities ====
Carjackings were common in Newark, New Jersey, in the 1990s, and a wave of carjackings took place again in 2010. There were 288 carjackings in the city in 2010 (a 70% increase from the previous year), and Essex County (which includes Newark) had 69 in December 2010 alone. The Associated Press reported that "unlike previous carjackings, in which thieves would strip vehicles for parts or sell them in other states, the recent wave perplexed law enforcement officials because almost all appeared to be done by thrill-seeking young men who would steal the cars for a few hours, drive them around and then abandon them." After federal, state, and law enforcement agencies formed a task force, 42 suspects were charged, and carjackings dropped dramatically. However, national media attention on carjackings in Essex County returned in December 2013, when a Hoboken lawyer was murdered at The Mall at Short Hills in Millburn, New Jersey, while defending his wife from four assailants, who were all later convicted of the crime.

On the night of April 18, 2013, Chinese national Dun "Danny" Meng was held at gunpoint by brothers Dzhokhar and Tamerlan Tsarnaev, perpetrators of the Boston Marathon bombing three days earlier, at a gas station in Cambridge, Massachusetts. The Tsarnaev brothers had hijacked Meng's car, a Mercedes-Benz M-Class, and filled it with enough gas to drive to Times Square, where they were plotting their next attack. While both brothers were distracted, Meng managed to get out of his Mercedes and run to a different gas station across the street, where he urged the cashier inside to call 911.

For several years (but no longer), the major U.S. city with the highest rates of carjacking was Detroit. In 2008, Detroit had 1,231 carjackings, more than three a day. By 2013, that number had fallen to 701, but this was still the highest known number of carjackings for any major city in the country. The significant decrease in carjackings was credited to a coordinated effort by the Detroit Police Department, the FBI, and the local federal prosecutor's office. Serial carjackers were targeted for federal prosecutions and longer sentences, and in 2009 the Detroit Police Department centralized all carjacking investigations and developed a suspect profiling system. Through mid-November 2014, Detroit had 486 carjackings, down 31% from the year before, but this was still three times more than the carjackings experienced by New York City (which has ten times Detroit's population) in all of 2013. Even James Craig, chief of police of the Detroit Police Department, was the victim of an attempted carjacking while he was in his police cruiser.

A 2017 study used "Risk Terrain Modeling" analysis to identify spatial indicators of carjacking risk in Detroit. The analysis identified six factors that "were influential in the best fitting model: proximity to service stations; convenience/grocery/liquor stores; bus stops; residential and commercial demolitions; and areas with high concentrations of drug arrests and restaurants." The study found that certain locations in Detroit "had an expected rate of carjacking that was 278 times higher than other locations."

As of 2021, the American city with the highest number of carjackings is Chicago. Chicago began experiencing a surge in carjackings after 2019, and at least 1,415 such crimes took place in the city in 2020. According to the Chicago Police Department, carjackers are using face masks that are widely worn due to the ongoing COVID-19 pandemic to effectively blend in with the public and conceal their identity. 2021 saw a further increase to a 20-year high of over 1,800 carjackings. On January 27, 2021, Mayor Lori Lightfoot described the worsening wave of carjackings as being 'top of mind,' and added 40 police officers to the CPD carjacking unit.

Many other cities have seen a similar increase in carjackings since the onset of the COVID-19 pandemic. Over 500 carjackings were recorded in New York City in 2021, compared to 328 in 2020 and 132 in 2019. Likewise, the police department of Philadelphia reported over 800 in 2021, compared to 170 in 2015. 281 carjackings occurred in New Orleans in 2021 while 105 occurred there in 2018, while Oakland reported 301 carjackings in 2020 and 521 carjackings in 2021.

==== State law ====
Some states have a specific carjacking statute. Other states do not have a specific carjacking law, and prosecute carjackers under the general robbery statute.

The law of some states, such as Louisiana, explicitly lists a killing in the course of defending oneself against forcible entry of an occupied motor vehicle as a justifiable homicide.

=== United Kingdom ===
Carjacking is an uncommon crime in Britain, making up about 1% of all vehicle thefts.

=== Australia ===
Australia does not specifically record the number of carjackings; such crimes are variously recorded as assault, robbery, motor vehicle theft, and some combination. However, a 2008 paper by the Australian Institute of Criminology, analyzing police and insurance records, suggested that fewer than 300 carjackings occur annually in Australia (about 0.5% of all theft incidents in the country). The paper noted that the low incidence of carjacking compared to the United States is attributable to the low rate of firearm-related crime in Australia and the fact that the "broader socioeconomic picture of Australian society is one of relative good health in terms of wealth distribution and social cohesion" providing little motivation for victimization that is "both personal and violent." The paper notes that although carjacking was rare, isolated hot spots do arise occasionally, and that since the late 1990s, "Sydney has experienced a number of carjacking clusters ... each lasting around three to six months and occurring in different locations including the eastern suburbs, the inner city and the south-west."

=== Philippines ===
The Philippine National Police keeps a record on the number of incidents of index crimes in the Philippines including carjacking. The act of carnapping, as it is known in the country, is penalized under the Anti-Carnapping Act of 2016.

== See also ==
- Aircraft hijacking (skyjacking)
- Piracy (hijacking of a ship)
- Anti-hijack system
- Car chase
- Chop shop
- Containerization
- Hostage taking
- Kidnapping
- Motor vehicle theft
- Murders of Channon Christian and Christopher Newsom
- Murder of João Hélio
- Murder of Mirelle Hernández
- Murder of Pam Basu
- Murder of Khuan Phokaeng
- Traffic stop
