= Blaster (flamethrower) =

South African flamethrower

The Blaster is a flamethrower invented in South Africa in 1998 to prevent carjacking. Despite being controversial, it was not banned. It did not sell well, and production was discontinued in 2001.

== History ==
In 1998, South African Charl Fourie invented Blaster, flamethrowers installed on a car to be used as a defence against carjacking. The invention came in response to increased violent crime in South Africa, which, in 1998, ranked highest in the world on a per capita basis for murder, assault, rape and carjacking.

The product used liquefied petroleum gas, and was installed along the sides of the vehicle under the doors. If a carjacker tried to enter the vehicle (for example, while it was stopped in traffic), the occupant could flip a switch to direct 2-metre (6 1/2 ft) plumes of flame toward their faces.

== Reception ==
In South Africa, it is legal to use lethal force in self-defence if in fear for one's life, and ownership of flamethrowers is unrestricted. Fourie claimed Blaster was unlikely to kill but would "definitely blind" the assailant.

The product was controversial, with some, including the Automobile Association of South Africa, speculating that the device might cause more carjackers to shoot drivers before approaching the vehicle, a tactic that was already fairly common. The Blaster received ample (and often satirical) media coverage from abroad. In particular, it earned its inventor the 1999 Ig Nobel Peace Prize (a parody of the real Nobel Prizes).

The device, however, was not banned but its 3,900 rand ($655) price limited its market and it was also not turning a profit.

== Decline ==
By 2001, having sold a few hundred of the Blaster, Fourie took it off the market and started marketing a less expensive pocket-sized "personal flamethrower".

== See also ==
- List of flamethrowers
