= Vehicle Theft Protection Program =

Educational initiative in North America

Vehicle Theft Protection Program is an educational initiative in North America started by the National Insurance Crime Bureau (NICB) and LoJack Corporation designed to help owners of cars, motorcycles, construction equipment and commercial vehicles better understand how to protect their assets from theft.

The two theft prevention organizations kick off the annual program each year by designating July as "National Vehicle Theft Protection Month", as July has one of the highest vehicle theft rates.

== History ==
The Vehicle Theft Protection Program was launched in late June 2007 by NICB, a not-for-profit organization dedicated to stopping vehicle theft and insurance fraud, and LoJack Corporation, a company that provides tracking and recovery systems for stolen mobile assets.

As part of the program, the organizations commissioned a national survey of 1,000 adults to determine areas where consumers needed the most education regarding vehicle theft protection. The survey found that the majority of respondents had bad habits when it came to protecting their vehicles from theft. A full 33 percent left their cars running unattended, while 40 percent did not hide valuables from view when leaving their car.

For motorcycle owners, the program offered an on-line “Fitness Test” geared to gauge the risk of theft for motorcycle enthusiasts. The on-line survey revealed that 67 percent of motorcycle owners who responded are at a high risk for theft. More than 1,800 respondents participated in the 10-question Fitness Test on the LoJack website during July and August 2007.

And for construction equipment owners, NICB and LoJack have led ongoing seminars that have been presented at trade shows around the country offering practical advice to protect construction equipment against theft.

To accompany the program, a booklet entitled “Get in the Know: Learn to Protect Your Vehicle from Theft” was also created to provide facts, statistics and practical steps owners can take to protect their assets.

Now in its fourth year, the educational initiative aims to raise consumer awareness of vehicle theft and theft protection through a series of events, informative materials, podcasts, surveys and a presence on a variety of websites.

== See also ==
- Motor vehicle theft
