= Remote starter =

Radio controlled device to start a vehicle engine

A remote starter is a radio controlled device, which is installed in a vehicle by the factory or an aftermarket installer to preheat or cool the vehicle before the owner gets into it. Once activated, by pushing a button on a special key chain remote, it starts the vehicle automatically for a predetermined time. Different models have keyless entry as well. Most newer vehicles need some kind of bypass module to bypass the factory anti-theft system, so the vehicle can be started without the ignition key in the ignition, this is bypassed only to start the vehicle, which after it is running returns to its original state. For cars with manual transmission additional safety features may need to be added to prevent the car from starting while it is parked in gear. Having a remote starter installed in a vehicle will usually not void the factory warranty when installed properly.

The first U.S. patent (#3248555) for a remote car starter was issued to Samuel Fried of Omaha, Nebraska in 1963. Galvani and Barratelli of Illinois were awarded a patent in 1971.

The first manufacturer to introduce remote start bypass modules to bypass vehicle anti-theft systems was Fortin auto radio based in Montreal, Quebec (Canada). By 1985 multiple manufacturers began producing the devices and automobile manufacturers began offering the remote start devices as an option.

Newer cars with pushbutton starts can also be interfaced, but some do not have a "take over" procedure.

== Technology ==
A remote starter is radio controlled and connected to the car's computer. The aim of this feature is to have the engine running for a given time for cooling or preheating the car before using it, to save time during winter times which requires defrosting the windshield.

== Benefits and issues ==
=== Benefits ===
The installation of a remote starter device in a vehicle may come with the following benefits:

- Ideal temperature before reaching the car
- Security: remote activation of the engine locks the doors of the vehicle automatically

=== Issues ===
However, use of a remote starter may also pose the following issues:

- Wasted fuel
- Large carbon dioxide emissions

==== Safety issues ====
Additional safety issues may include:

- starting the engine with a manual transmission left in gear
- unattended vehicle is not recommended
- warranty may be broken in some conditions

Installation of a remote starter may compromise a vehicle's warranty, unless done by a professional.

== Local regulations ==
Some cities like Toronto forbid idling of vehicles for more than one minute per the Toronto municipal code, chapter 517, related to idling of vehicles and boats.

In Australia, the remote start engine feature may be available, but its use might be subject to local legality of leaving a vehicle's engine running while not in use:

If the driver will be over 3 metres from the closest part of the vehicle, the driver must switch off the engine.

— Regulation 213 of the NSW Road Rules (2014),

In Australia, activation of the RES may require agreement of a stringent set of terms and conditions:

the use of Remote Engine Start is governed by various laws. The use of this function might be unlawful.
