= Smart key =

Electronic access and authorization system

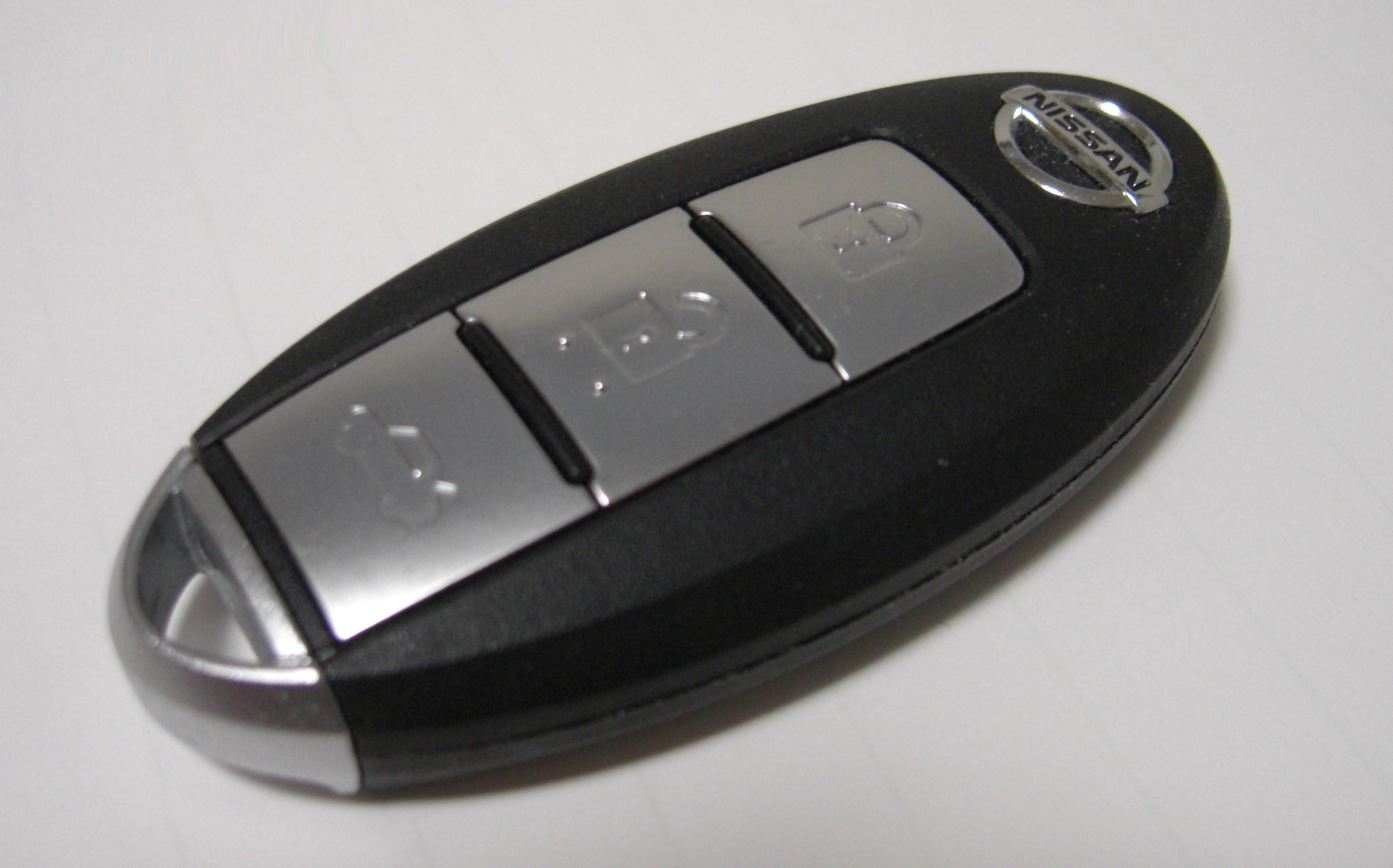
A Nissan Fuga intelligent key

A smart key is a vehicular passive entry system developed by Siemens in 1995 and introduced by Mercedes-Benz under the name "Keyless-Go" in 1998 on the W220 S-Class, after the design patent was filed by Daimler-Benz on May 17, 1997.

Numerous manufacturers subsequently developed similar passive systems that unlock a vehicle on approach — while the key remains pocketed by the user.

== Operation ==
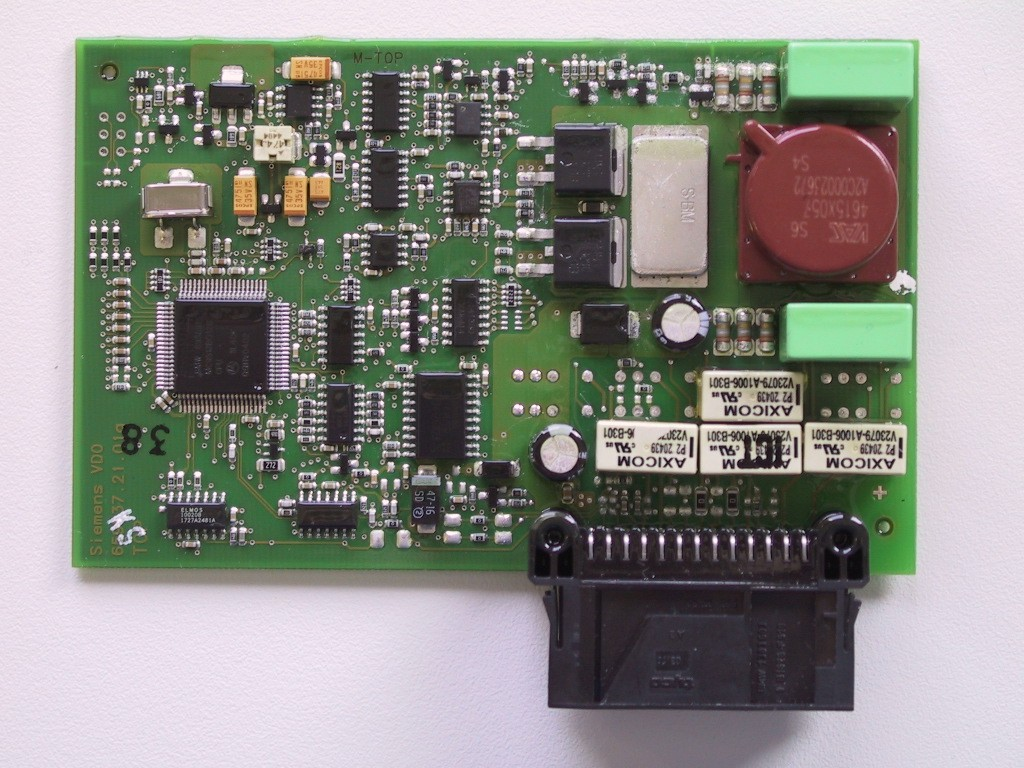
The first KeylessGo ECU of the Mercedes-Benz S-Class

The smart key allows the driver to keep the key fob pocketed when unlocking, locking and starting the vehicle. The key is identified via one of several antennas in the car's bodywork and an ISM band radio pulse generator in the key housing. Depending on the system, the vehicle is automatically unlocked when a button or sensor on the door handle or trunk release is pressed. Vehicles with a smart-key system have a mechanical backup, usually in the form of a spare key blade supplied with the vehicle. Some manufacturers hide the backup lock behind a cover for styling.

A push-button ignition switch in place of the immobilizer on a Mitsubishi RVR equipped with the Smart key.

Vehicles with a smart-key system can disengage the immobilizer and activate the ignition without inserting a key in the ignition, provided the driver has the key inside the car. On most vehicles, this is done by pressing a starter button or twisting an ignition switch.

When leaving a vehicle that is equipped with a smart-key system, the vehicle is locked by either pressing a button on a door handle, touching a capacitive area on a door handle, or simply walking away from the vehicle. The method of locking varies across models.

Some vehicles automatically adjust settings based on the smart key used to unlock the car. User preferences such as seat positions, steering wheel position, exterior mirror settings, climate control (e.g. temperature) settings, and stereo presets are popular adjustments. Some models, such as the Ford Escape, even have settings to prevent the vehicle from exceeding a maximum speed if it has been started with a certain key.

== Insurance standard ==
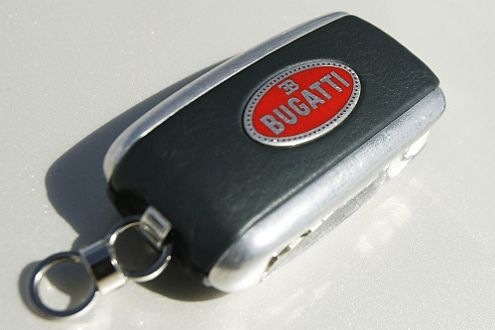
Bugatti keyless entry remote

In 2005, the UK motor insurance research expert Thatcham introduced a standard for keyless entry, requiring the device to be inoperable at a distance of more than 10 cm from the vehicle. In an independent test, the Nissan Micra's system was found to be the most secure, while certain BMW and Mercedes keys failed, being theoretically capable of allowing cars to be driven away while their owners were refueling. Despite these security vulnerabilities, auto theft rates have decreased 7 percent between 2009 and 2010, and the National Insurance Crime Bureau credits smart keys for this decrease.

== SmartKeys ==
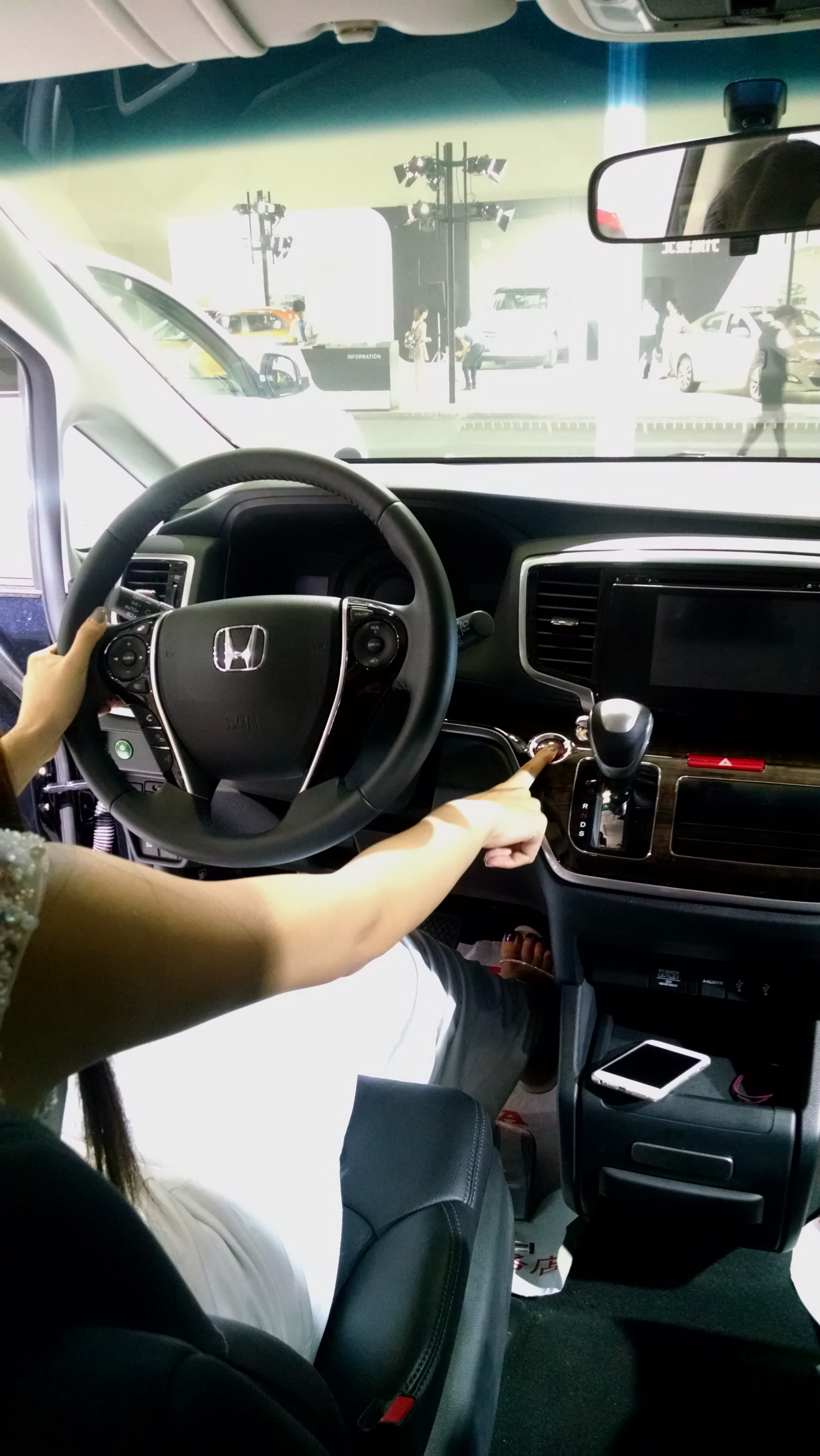
A woman shows Honda Odyssey (international) Smart Entry System

SmartKeys were developed by Siemens in the mid-1990s and introduced by Mercedes-Benz in 1997 to replace the infrared security system introduced in 1989. Daimler-Benz filed the first patents for SmartKey on February 28, 1997, in German patent offices, with multifunction switchblade key variants following on May 17, 1997. The device entailed a plastic key to be used in place of the traditional metal key. Electronics that control locking systems and the ignitions made it possible to replace the traditional key with a sophisticated computerized "Key". It is considered a step up from remote keyless entry. The SmartKey adopts the remote control buttons from keyless entry, and incorporates them into the SmartKey fob.

Once inside a Mercedes-Benz vehicle, the SmartKey fob, unlike keyless entry fobs, is placed in the ignition slot where a starter computer verifies the rolling code. Verified in milliseconds, it can then be turned as a traditional key to start the engine. The device was designed with the cooperation of Siemens Automotive and Huf exclusively for Mercedes-Benz, but many luxury manufacturers have implemented similar technology based on the same idea. In addition to the SmartKey, Mercedes-Benz now integrates as an option Keyless Go; this feature allows the driver to keep the SmartKey in their pocket, yet giving them the ability to open the doors, trunk as well as starting the car without ever removing it from their pocket.

The SmartKey's electronics are embedded in a hollow, triangular piece of plastic, wide at the top, narrow at the bottom, squared-off at the tip with a half-inch-long insert piece. The side of the SmartKey also hides a traditional Mercedes-Benz key that can be pulled out from a release at the top. The metal key is used for valet purposes such as locking the glove compartment and/or trunk before the SmartKey is turned over to a parking attendant. Once locked manually, the trunk cannot be opened with the SmartKey or interior buttons. The key fob utilizes a radio-frequency transponder to communicate with the door locks, but it uses infrared to communicate with the engine immobilizer system. The original SmartKeys had a limited frequency and could have only been used in line-of-sight for safety purposes. The driver can also point the smart key at the front driver side door while pushing and holding the unlock button on the SmartKey and the windows and the sunroof will open in order to ventilate the cabin. Similarly, if the same procedure is completed while holding the lock button, the windows and sunroof will close. In cars equipped with the Active Ventilated Seats, the summer opening feature will activate seat ventilation in addition to opening the windows and sunroof.

== Display Key ==
Display Key is a type of smart key developed by BMW that includes a small LCD color touchscreen on it. It performs the standard functions that a key fob would normally do such as locking, unlocking & keyless start, but because of the screen the user can also perform a number of the features from BMW's app, one of which includes commanding the car to self park from the key if your car has self parking capability. The key is currently available for the 3 Series, 4 Series, 5 Series, 6 Series, 7 Series, 8 Series, X3, X4, X5, X6, and X7. The key is rechargeable and will last about 3 weeks. It can be charged via a micro USB port on the side or wirelessly on the center console.

== Keyless Go ==
Keyless Go (also: Keyless Entry / Go; Passive Entry / Go) is Mercedes' term for an automotive technology which allows a driver to lock and unlock a vehicle without using the corresponding SmartKey buttons. Once a driver enters a vehicle with an equipped Keyless Go SmartKey or Keyless Go wallet-size card, they have the ability to start and stop the engine, without inserting the SmartKey. A transponder built within the SmartKey allows the vehicle to identify a driver. An additional safety feature is integrated into the vehicle, making it impossible to lock a SmartKey with Keyless Go inside a vehicle.

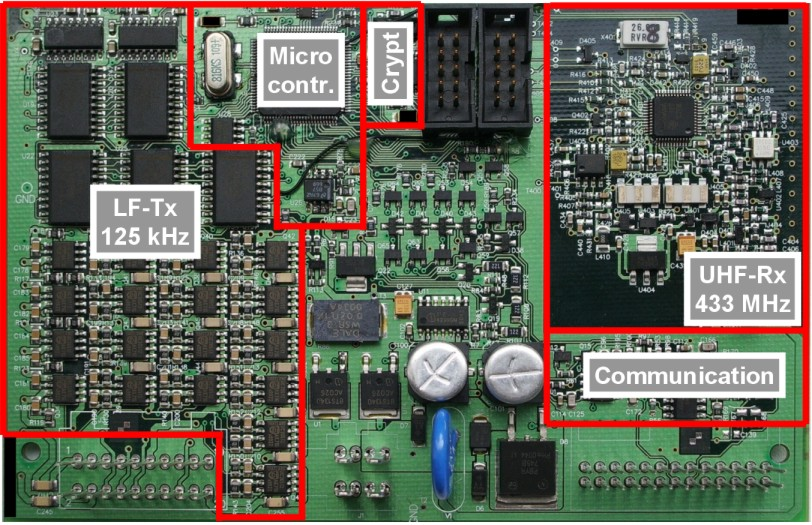
Hardware blocks on the Keyless Entry/Go ECU

The system works by having a series of LF (low frequency 125 kHz) transmitting antennas both inside and outside the vehicle. The external antennas are located in the door handles. When the vehicle is triggered, either by pulling the handle or touching the handle, an LF signal is transmitted from the antennas to the key. The key becomes activated if it is sufficiently close and it transmits its ID back to the vehicle via RF (Radio frequency >300 MHz) to a receiver located in the vehicle. If the key has the correct ID, the PASE module unlocks the vehicle.

The hardware blocks of a Keyless Entry / Go Electronic control unit ECU are based on its functionality:

- transmitting low-frequency LF signals via the 125 kHz power amplifier block
- receiving radio frequency RF signals (> 300 MHz) from the built-in ISM receiver block
- encrypting and decrypting all relevant data signals (security)
- communicating relevant interface signals with other electronic control units
- microcontroller

== Inside Outside detection ==
The smart key determines if it is inside or outside the vehicle by measuring the strength of the LF fields. In order to start the vehicle, the smart key must be inside the vehicle.

== Security requirements ==
It is important that the vehicle can't be started when the user and therefore the smart key is outside the vehicle. This is especially important at fueling stations where the user is very close to the vehicle. The internal LF field is allowed to overshoot by a maximum of 10 cm to help minimise this risk. Maximum overshoot is usually found on the side windows where there is very little attenuation of the signal.

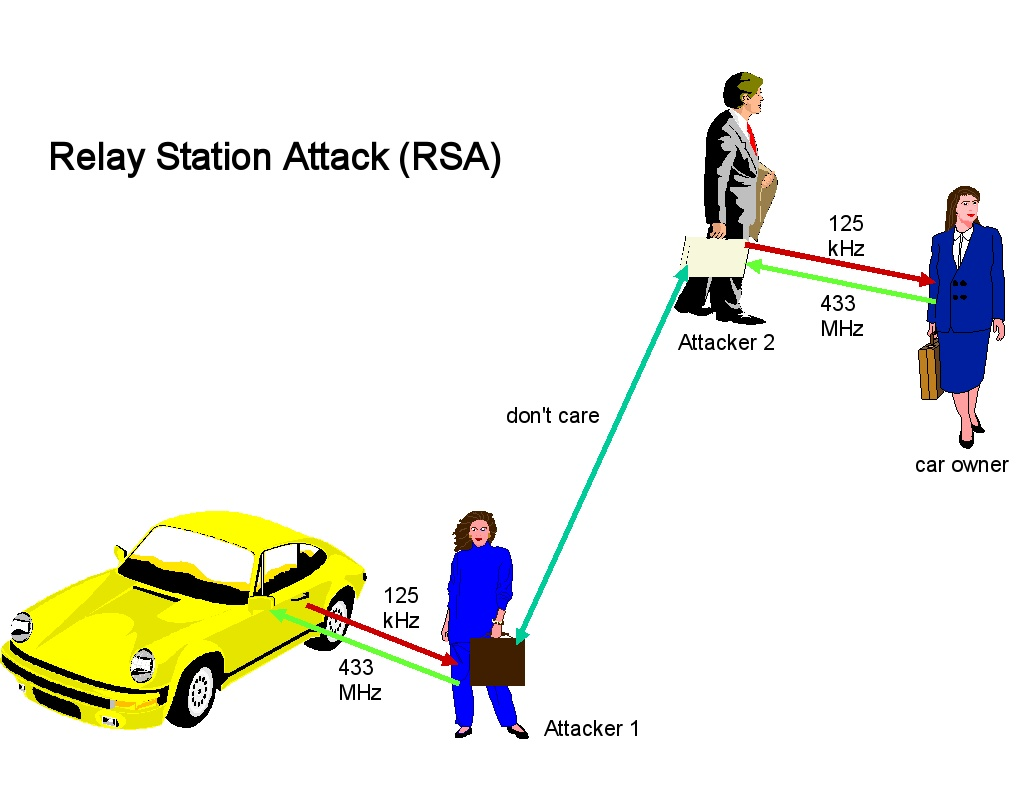
Relay Station Attack

A second scenario exists under the name "relay station attack" (RSA). The RSA is based on the idea of reducing the long physical distance between the car and the regular car owner's SmartKey. Two relay stations will be needed for this: The first relay station is located nearby the car and the second is close to the SmartKey. So on first view, the Keyless Entry / Go ECU and the SmartKey could communicate together. A third person at the car could pull the door handle and the door would open. However, in every Keyless Entry / Go system provisions exist to avoid a successful two-way communication via RSA. Some of the most known are:

- measuring group delay time to detect illegal high values
- measuring third-order intercept point to detect illegal intermodulation products
- measuring field strength of the electric field
- measuring the response time of 125 kHz LC circuit
- using a more complex modulation (i.e. quadrature amplitude modulation) which can't be demodulated and modulated by a simple relay station

Furthermore, Keyless Entry / Go communicates with other Control Units within the same vehicle. Depending on the electric car architecture, the following are some Control Systems that can be enabled or disabled:

- ESCL Electric Steering Column Lock
- EIS Electronic Ignition Switch
- Central door locking system
- Immobiliser
- Engine Control Unit (Motor management system)
- BCU Body control unit

Another possibility is using a motion sensor within the key fob.

== Internal LF field dead spots ==
Dead spots are a result of the maximum overshoot requirement from above. The power delivered to the internal LF antennas has to be tuned to provide the best performance i.e. minimum dead spots and maximum average overshoot. Dead spots are usually near the extremities of the vehicle e.g. the rear parcel shelf.

== Battery backup ==
If the battery in the smart key becomes depleted, it is necessary for there to be a backup method of opening and starting the vehicle. Opening is achieved by an emergency (fully mechanical) key blade usually hidden in the smart key. On many cars emergency starting is achieved by use of an inductive coupling. The user either has to put the key in a slot or hold it near a special area on the cockpit, where there is an inductive coil hidden behind which transfers energy to a matching coil in the dead key fob using inductive charging.

Slots have proven to be problematic, as they can go wrong and the key becomes locked in and cannot be removed. Another problem with the slot is it can't compensate for a fob battery below certain operating threshold. Most smart key batteries are temperature sensitive causing the fob to become intermittent, fully functional, or inoperative all in the same day.

== Special cases ==
A Keyless Entry / Go system should be able to detect and handle most of the following cases:

- SmartKey Transponder was forgotten in the rear trunk
- More than one SmartKey is present inside the car
- SmartKey getting lost during the drive
- Smartkey battery low (Limp-Home)

== Effectiveness ==
A test by ADAC revealed that 20 car models with Keyless Go could be entered and driven away without the key. In 2014, 6,000 cars (about 17 per day) were stolen using keyless entry in London.

== See also ==
- Remote keyless system
- Transponder car key
