= Keychain =

Device attached to a key or several keys

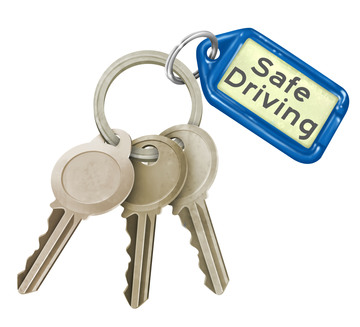
Three keys on a keyring with a promotional message on its plastic fob

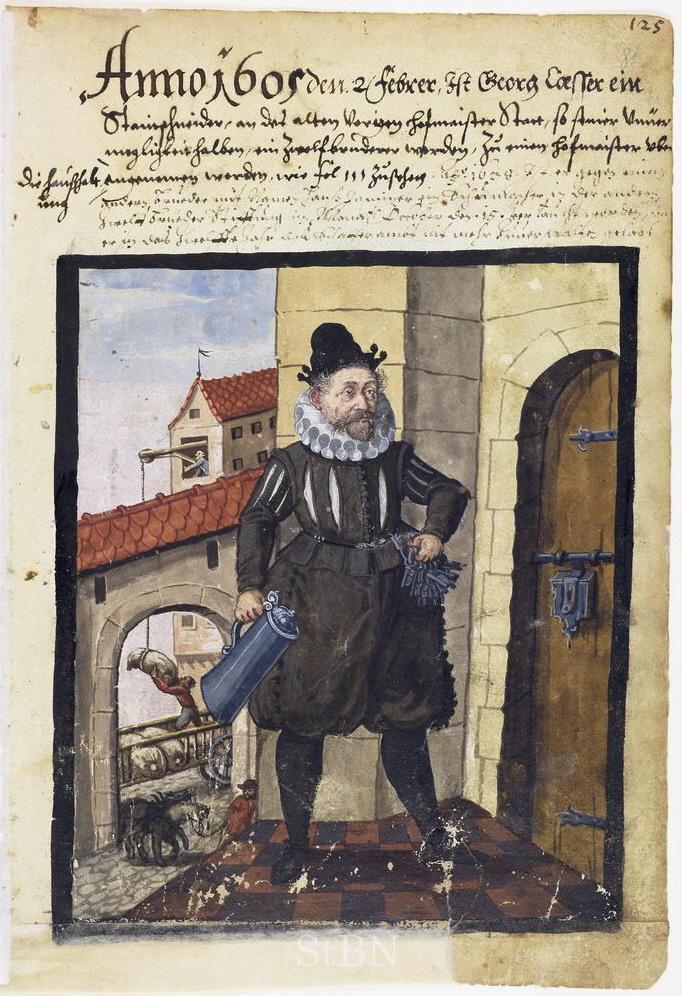
Keybearer with a keyring, 1605, from one of the Nürnberger Hausbücher

A keychain (/ˈkiːtʃeɪn/), also called a key chain or keyring, is a small ring or chain of metal to which keys may be attached. The terms keyring and keychain are often used interchangeably to mean both the individual ring or chain, or a combined unit of a ring and decorative or functional fob.

The length of a keychain or fob may also allow an item to be used more easily than if connected directly to a keyring. Some keychains allow one or both ends to rotate, keeping the keychain from becoming twisted, while the item is being used.

== Keyring ==
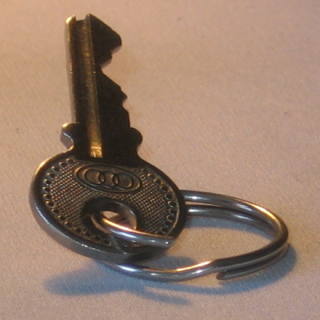
A key can be added to a keyring by forcing an end of the loop open and sliding the key along the spiral.

A keyring or "split ring" is a typically metal ring that holds keys and other small items sometimes connected to fobs or keychains.

Keyrings were invented in the 19th century by Samuel Harrison. The most common form is a single piece of metal in a double loop known as a circle cotter . Either end of the loop can be pried open to allow a key to be inserted and slid along the spiral until it becomes wholly engaged onto the ring. Often the keyring is adorned with a fob for identification, such as motel keys, or personal taste.

Other forms of rings may use a single loop of metal or plastic, and rings that include a mechanism to open and securely close the loop. Spring-gated novelty carabiners are commonly used as keyrings for ease of access and exchange.

== Key fob ==
A key fob is a generally decorative and at times useful item many people often carry with their keys, on a ring or a chain, for ease of tactile identification, to provide a better grip, or to make a personal statement. Key fob can also specifically refer to modern electronic access control devices, and smart keys which integrate both key and remote as one.

The word fob may be linked to the low German dialect for the word Fuppe, meaning "pocket"; however, the real origin of the word is uncertain. Fob pockets (meaning 'sneak proof' from the German word foppen) were pockets meant to deter thieves. A short "fob chain" was used to attach to items, like a pocket watch, placed in these pockets.

=== Access control key fob ===
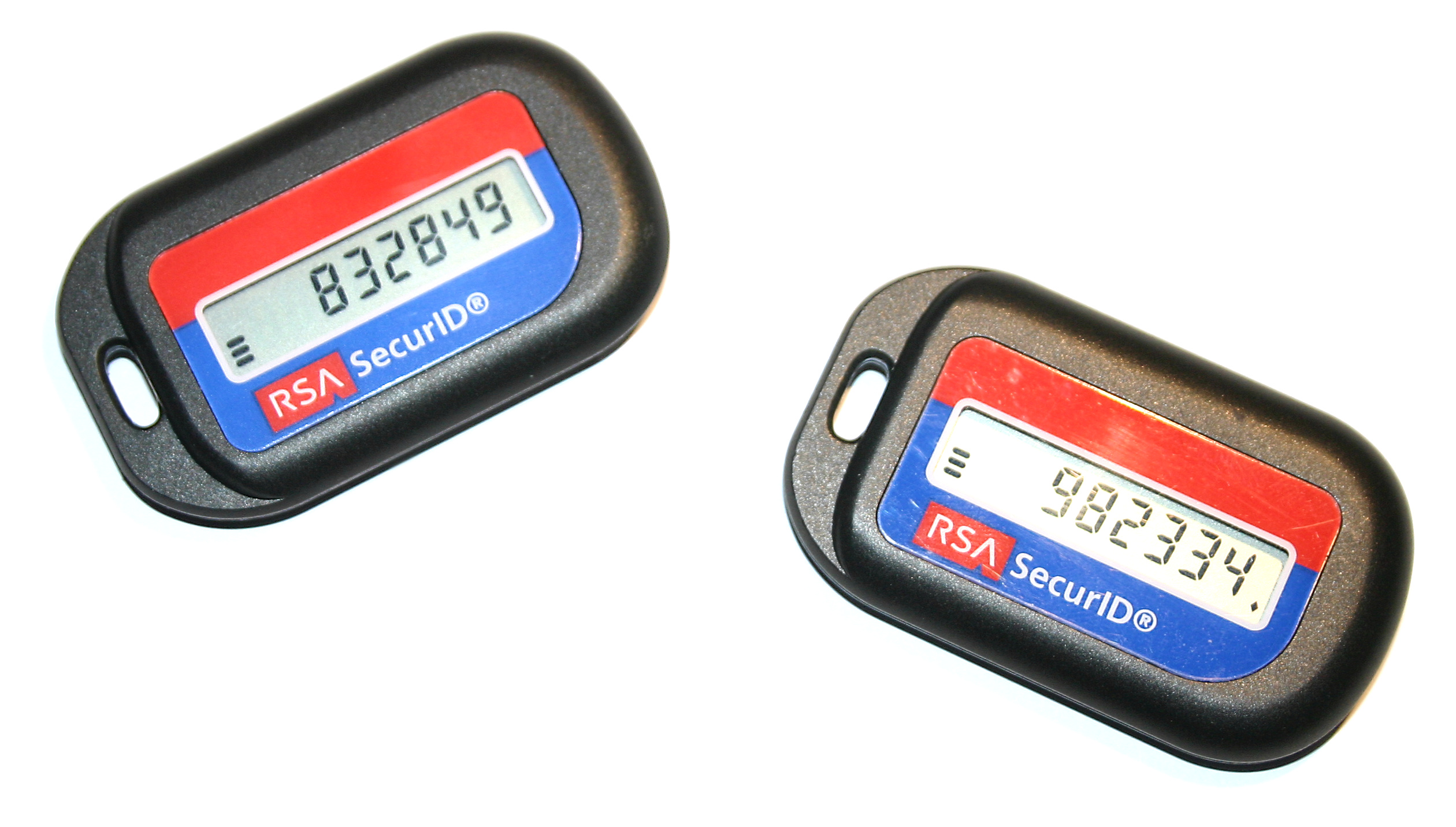
Security tokens from RSA Security designed as key fobs.

Access control key fobs are electronic key fobs that are used for controlling access to buildings or vehicles. They are used for activating such things as remote keyless entry systems on motor vehicles. Early electric key fobs operated using infrared and required a clear line-of-sight to function. These could be copied using a programmable remote control. More recent models use challenge–response authentication over radio frequency, making them harder to copy and more readily operable. Programming these remotes sometimes requires the automotive dealership to connect a diagnostic tool, but many of them can be self-programmed by following a sequence of steps in the vehicle and usually requires at least one working key.

Some retail establishments such as gasoline stations and clothing stores keep their washrooms and changing rooms locked, requiring customers to procure a key from an attendant. These often have a very large fob so that customers will not unthinkingly pocket and walk off with the key when they are done with it.

Key fobs offering added functionalities connected to online services may require additional subscription payment to access them.

== Digital keychains ==
In cryptography, a keyring is a database of multiple cryptographic keys or passwords.

The computer terms keychain and keyring are often used for software, such as GNU Privacy Guard, that stores cryptographic keys. Mac OS X uses a password storage system called the Apple Keychain. A "GNOME Keyring" is also the name of a password manager application working under the GNOME desktop manager (used for example in Ubuntu operating system). There are also portable password manager programs, such as Keepass and KeePassX.

== See also ==
- Key finder
