= Self-defense =

Countermeasure to defend oneself against harm

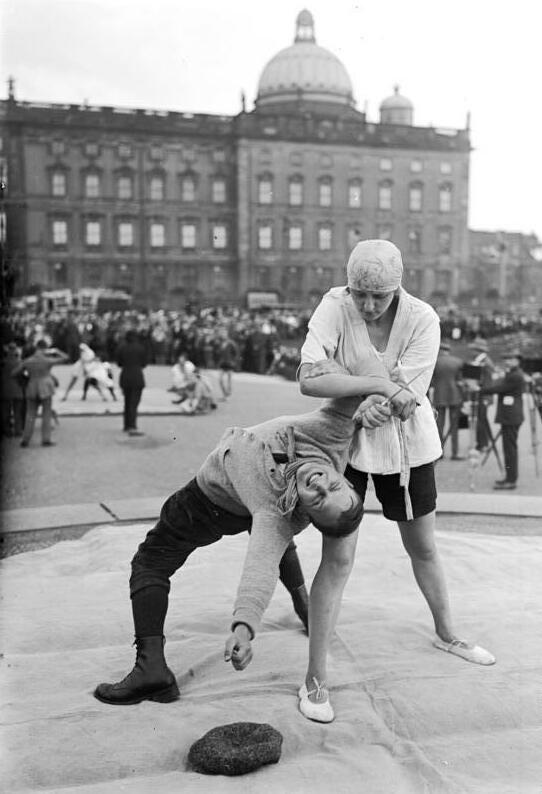
A woman demonstrating a jujutsu self-defense move against a knife attack in Berlin, 1924

Self-defense, or self-defence in Commonwealth English, is a countermeasure that involves defending the health and well-being of oneself from harm. The use of the right of self-defense as a legal justification for the use of force in times of danger is available in many jurisdictions. Self-defense in the context of a home invasion or trespassing is also known as home defense.

== Physical ==
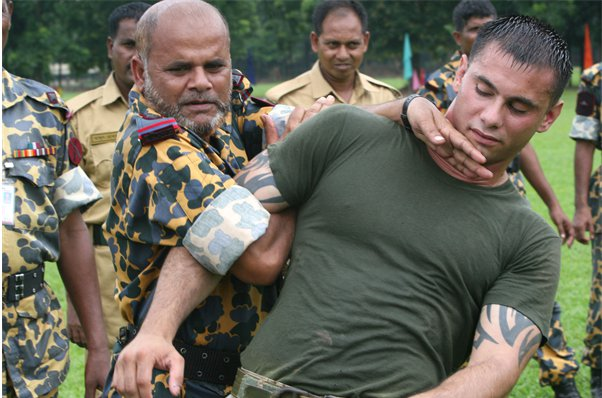
A Bangladesh Rifles Senior Warrant Officer (left in yellow-green camo) applies a mechanical advantage control/hold to a United States Marine during a demonstration.

Physical self-defense is using physical force to counter an immediate threat of violence. Such force can be either armed or unarmed. In either case, the chances of success depend on various parameters, related to the severity of the threat on one hand, but also on the mental and physical preparedness of the defender.

=== Unarmed ===
Many martial arts styles are practiced for self-defense or include self-defense techniques. Some styles train primarily for self-defense, while other combat sports can be effectively applied for self-defense. Some martial arts teach how to escape from a knife or gun situation or how to break away from a punch, while others teach how to attack. Many modern martial arts schools now use a combination of martial arts styles and techniques to provide more practical self-defense. They will often customize self-defense training to suit individual participants.

=== Armed ===
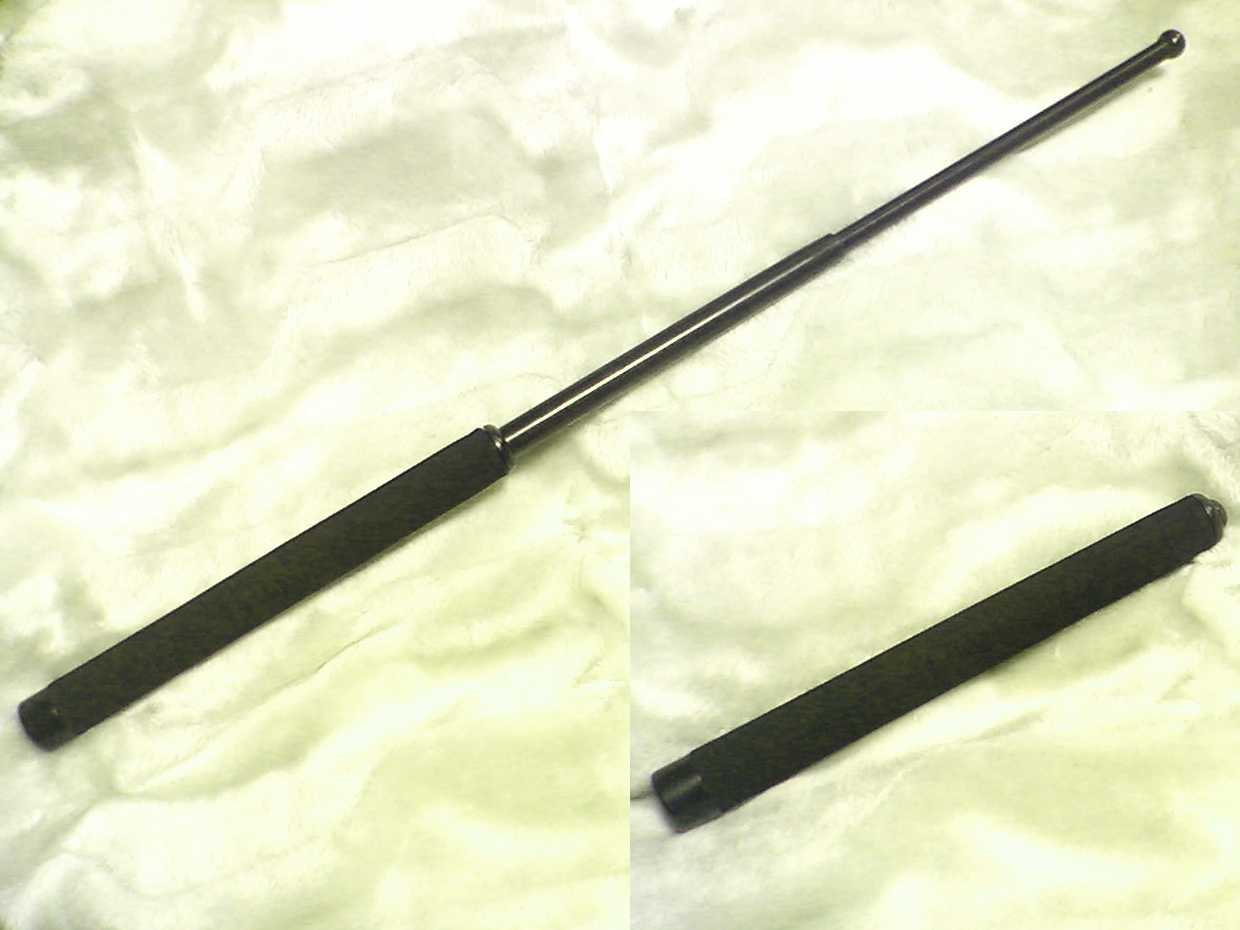
This telescopic steel security baton is sold to the public in Japan (2009).

A wide variety of weapons can be deployed defensively. The most suitable depends on the threat presented, the victim or victims, and the defender's experience. Legal restrictions also vary greatly and influence which self-defense options are available. In some jurisdictions, firearms may be carried openly or concealed expressly for this purpose. In contrast, other jurisdictions have tight restrictions on who can own firearms and what types they can own. Knives, especially those categorized as switchblades, may also be controlled, as may batons, pepper spray and personal electroshock weapons—although some may be legal to carry with a license or for certain professions.

Non-injurious water-based self-defense indelible dye-marker sprays, or ID-marker or DNA-marker sprays linking a suspect to a crime scene, would in most places be legal to own and carry. Everyday objects (Some examples including: flashlights, baseball bats, newspapers, keyrings with keys, kitchen utensils, tools, and hair spray aerosol cans in combination with a lighter) can also be used as improvised weapons for self-defense.

== Verbal ==
Verbal self-defense is defined as using words "to prevent, de-escalate, or end an attempted assault."

== Women's self-defense ==
According to Victims of Sexual Violence: Statistics on Rainn, about "80 percent of juvenile victims were female and 90 percent of rape victims were adult women". In addition, women from ages 18 to 34 are highly at risk to experience sexual assault. According to historian Wendy Rouse in Her Own Hero: The Origins of Women's Self-Defense Movement, women's self-defense training emerged in the early twentieth century in the United States and the United Kingdom, paralleling the women's rights and suffrage movement. These early feminists sought to raise awareness about the sexual harassment and violence that women faced on the street, at work, and in the home. They challenged the notion that men were their "natural protectors", noting that men were often the perpetrators of violence against women. Women discovered a sense of physical and personal empowerment through training in boxing and jiu-jitsu. Interest in women's self-defense paralleled subsequent waves of the women's rights movement, especially with the rise of second-wave feminism in the 1960s and 1970s and third-wave feminism in the 1990s.

Empowerment Self-Defense (ESD) courses focus on teaching verbal, psychological, and physical self-defense strategies. ESD courses explore the multiple sources of gender-based violence, including its connections with sexism, racism, and classism. Empowerment Self-Defense instructors focus on holding perpetrators responsible while empowering women with the idea that they have the right and ability to protect themselves.

== Self-defense education ==
Self-defense techniques and recommended behavior under the threat of violence are systematically taught in self-defense classes. Commercial self-defense education is part of the martial arts industry in the broader sense, and many martial arts instructors also give self-defense classes. While all martial arts training can be argued to have some self-defense applications, self-defense courses are marketed explicitly as being oriented towards effectiveness and optimized towards situations as they occur in the real world. Many systems are taught commercially, tailored to the needs of specific target audiences (e.g. defense against attempted rape for women, self-defense for children and teens). Notable systems taught commercially include:

- Civilian versions of modern military combatives, such as Krav Maga, Defendo, Spear, Systema
- Japanese Armed & Unarmed Combat Art Systems are directly taught as Combatives with No Sport Aspect, also adapted to modern weapons such as Bujinkan
- Jujutsu and arts derived from it, such as Aikijujutsu, Aikido, Bartitsu, German ju-jutsu, and Kodokan Goshin Jutsu
- Traditional unarmed fighting styles like Karate, Kung fu, Hapkido, Pencak Silat, Taekkyon, etc. These styles can also include competing.
- Traditional armed fighting styles like Kali/Eskrima/Arnis. These include competing, as well as armed and unarmed combats.
- Street Fighting oriented, unarmed systems, such as Jeet Kune Do, Kajukenbo, Won Sung Do, and Keysi Fighting Method
- Martial arts, such as boxing, kickboxing, Muay Thai, savate, shoot boxing, Sanshou, Taekwondo, judo, Brazilian jiu-jitsu, Sambo, and wrestling.

== Legal aspects ==
=== Application of the law ===
Subject to the powers of the United Nations Security Council, a state’s right of self-defense is explicitly recognized in Article 51 of the United Nations Charter: “Nothing in the present Charter shall impair the inherent right of individual or collective self-defense if an armed attack occurs against a Member of the United Nations.” The right of self-defense is limited by a duty to take only proportional countermeasures. In any given case, evaluating whether force was proportional or excessive in any given instance can be difficult. Allowances for military force in self-defence, and even moreso humanitarian interventions, acting in defense on behalf of others in a state which has not given permission for the use of force, may be hard to reconcile with human rights. The Intermediate People's Court of Foshan, People's Republic of China in a 2009 case ruled that a woman killing a robber by crashing her car into the getaway vehicle during an escape attempt to be justifiable self-defense because "the robbery was still in progress" due to the criminals still being in the victim's sight.

In the United States between 2008 and 2012, approximately 1 out of every 38 gun-related deaths (which includes murders, suicides, and accidental deaths) was a justifiable killing, according to the Violence Policy Center.

In Canada, in criminal law, self-defense is a statutory defense that provides a complete defense to the commission of a criminal act. It operates as a justification, the successful application of which means that, owing to the circumstances in which the act was produced, it is not morally blameworthy. There are three elements an accused must demonstrate to raise self-defense successfully.

1. First, the accused must demonstrate that they believed on reasonable grounds that force would be used against them or another person or that a threat of force is being made against them or another person. The reasonableness of the belief is assessed through a subjective and objective lens. Certain beliefs, including racist beliefs and beliefs induced by self-intoxication, are prima facie unreasonable. Other beliefs related to the subjective experience of the accused may, however, be reasonable. These include any relevant military training (R v Khill), heightened awareness of patterns of cyclical violence in intimate relationships (R v Lavallée) and whether the accused has autism (R v Kagan).
2. Second, the act that constitutes the offence is committed to defend or protect themselves or the other person from that use or threat of force.
3. Third, the act that constitutes the offence must have been reasonable. Many indicia factor into whether the act was reasonable in the circumstances. For one, was the violence or threat of violence imminent? Usually, if there is a significant time interval between the original unlawful assault and the accused's response, it undermines the contention that there were no other means available to respond to the potential use of force, and one tends to suspect that the accused was motivated by revenge rather than self-defense. However, R v Lavallée accepted expert evidence demonstrating that people experiencing battered women's syndrome have special knowledge about the cyclical nature of violence in a way that allows them to foresee when harm is coming.

Whether a reasonable avenue of escape was available to the accused or not is also relevant. Under the old self-defense provision, there was a requirement for the accused to have believed on reasonable grounds that there was no alternative course of action open to them at the time, so that they reasonably thought that they were obliged to kill to preserve themselves from death or grievous bodily harm. Now, even though 34(2)(b) is only one consideration in a non-exhaustive list, the mandatory role it used to play in the common law suggests it carries considerable weight in determining the reasonableness of the act in the circumstances under 34(1)(c).

As such, while there is no absolute duty to retreat, it is a prerequisite to the defense that no other legal means of responding are available. In other words, there may be an obligation to do retreat where there is an option to do so (R v Cain). However, there is an exception to the obligation to retreat which is there is no requirement to flee from your own home to escape an assault to raise self-defense (R v Forde). Moreover, evidence of the accused suffering from battered women's syndrome may evince that the accused reasonably perceived there to have been no means of escape (R v Lavallée). Third, the accused's role in the incident may play into the reasonableness of their act. Consideration of the accused's role is not limited to whether he did any provocative or unlawful acts, as it was under the old self-defense provisions (R v Khill). Fourth, the nature and proportionality of the accused's response will determine whether it was reasonable. While a person is not expected to weigh to a nicety the measure of force used to respond to violence or a threat thereof, grossly disproportionate force will tend to be unreasonable (R v Kong).

== See also ==
Armed self-defense

- Airgun
- Ballistic knife
- Baton (law enforcement) / Tonfa (martial arts)
- Boot knife
- Brass knuckles
- Club (weapon)
- Crossbow
- CS gas
- Defense wound
- Defensive gun use
- Electroshock weapon
- Gun safety
- Handgun
- Hiatt speedcuffs
- Hollow-point bullet
- Knife / Combat knife
- Laser pointer
- Laser sight
- Mace (spray)
- Millwall brick
- Nunchuku
- Offensive weapon
- Paintball gun
- PAVA spray
- Pepper spray
- Personal defense weapon
- Riot shotgun
- Self-defense in international law
- Slapjack (weapon)
- Slingshot
- Soft-point bullet
- Stun grenade
- Switchblade
- Taser
- Throwing knife
- Tranquilizer gun
- Weighted-knuckle glove
- Kubaton

Unarmed self-defense

- Anti-theft system
- Armored car
- Body armor
- Bodyguard
- Cyber self-defense
- Digital self-defense
- Door security
- Gated community
- GPS tracking unit
- Guard dog
- Hand to hand combat
- Intrusion alarm
- Nonviolent self defense
- Peroneal strike
- Personal alarms
- Physical security
- Safe room
- Secure telephone
- Video surveillance systems

Legal and moral aspects

- Battered woman defense
- Castle doctrine
- Concealed carry
- Constitutional carry
- Duty to retreat
- Gun-free zone
- Gun laws in the United States (by state)
- Gun politics
- Gun politics in the United States
- Justifiable homicide
- Non-aggression principle
- Open Carry
- Reasonable force
- Self-defense in international law
- Self-preservation
- Sell your cloak and buy a sword
- Stand-your-ground law
- Use of force
- Turning the other cheek
