= Body identification =

Subfield of forensic science

Body identification is a subfield of forensic science that uses a variety of scientific and non-scientific methods to identify a body. Forensic purposes are served by rigorous scientific forensic identification techniques, but these are generally preceded by formal identification. This involves requesting a family member or friend of the victim to visually identify the body.

If a body is not badly decomposed or damaged, one or more persons who knew the deceased well can visually confirm their identity. Authorities will also compare supportive documents such as a driver's license, passport, or other authoritative photo ID before accepting a personal identification.

Any formal investigation should be used to support additional scientific evidence, allowing forensic scientists to either reinforce or question the supposed identity of the victim. Scientific methods are also used in cases where these introductory approaches are not possible. These scientific identification techniques, including anthropometry, skin analysis, dental records and genetics, rely on the individuality of each body. Factors such as body size, weight, skin prints, and blood type all act as indicators of identity. Forensic scientists analyse these characteristics in their process of identifying of a body. This process generally involves a comparison between antemortem information, from living individuals, either relatives or information from a missing person with postmortem information obtained from the dead unidentified individual.

== History ==
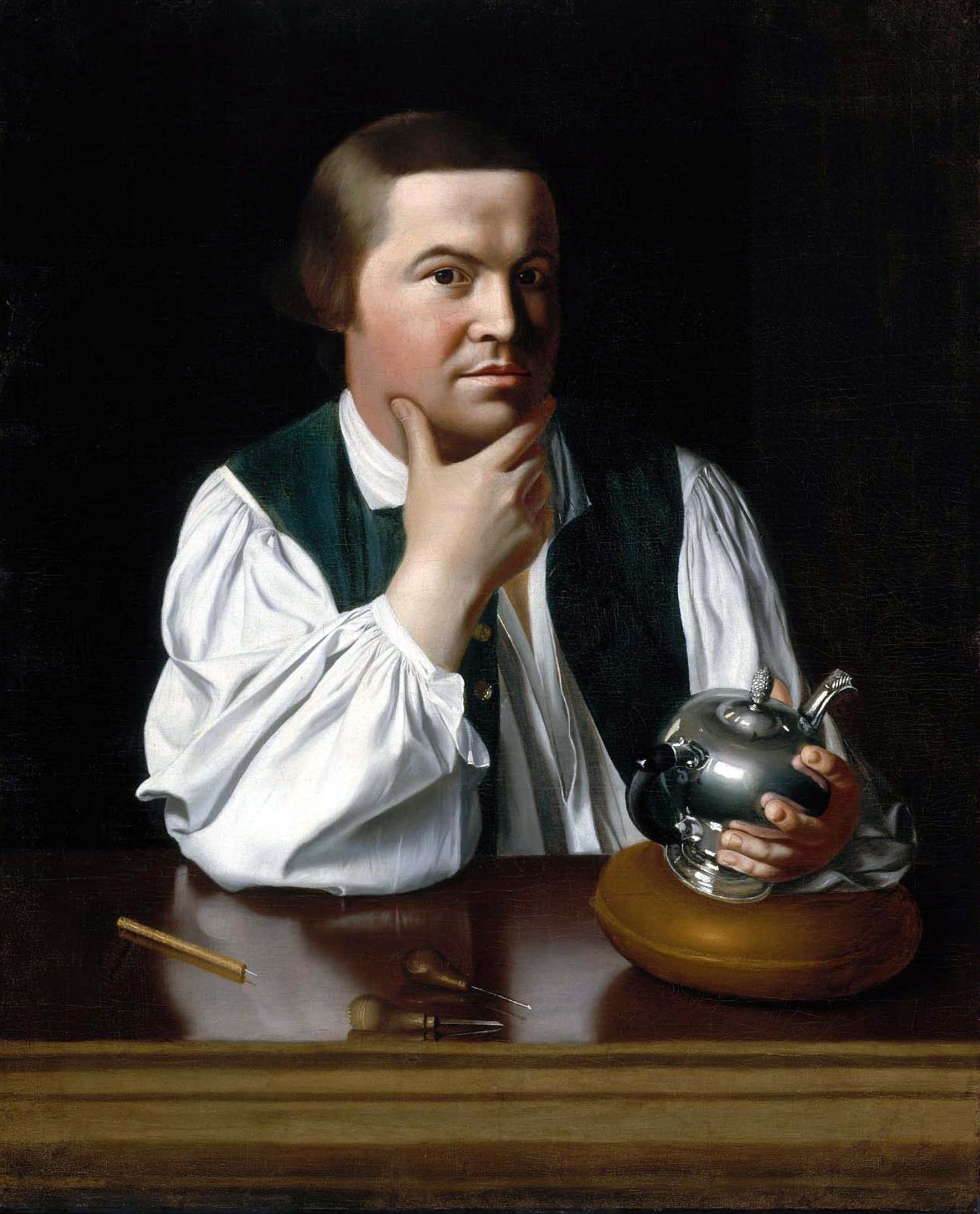
Paul Revere (pictured) used forensic dentistry to identify the body of Joseph Warren.

Traditional scientific identification methods developed in the late eighteenth and nineteenth centuries which allowed forensic scientists to identify a body without formal identification. These methods included dental analysis, anthropometry and fingerprinting. Forensic dentistry was first used in 1776 by Paul Revere, who identified the fallen soldier Joseph Warren by his false teeth. Anthropometry was first introduced in 1879 by Alphonse Bertillon, who developed the Bertillon System based on physical measurements. His findings were overtaken by the method of fingerprinting in the 1880s. Sir Francis Galton's observations of fingerprints as a means of identification proved to be more accurate.

Modern scientific identification techniques developed in the late twentieth century in response to the advancement of technology and research. These methods included the analysis of the skin's various prints and DNA profiling. Forensic scientists realised that there was more to the skin than just fingerprints, and that the use of palm and ear prints could also assist in the identification process. Alec Jeffreys was the first forensic scientist to use DNA analysis for the purpose of body identification in 1984. Since then, DNA examination has become popular in the forensic identification field.

== Military ==
In many cases, people who have died while serving in the military remain unidentified. This is due to the destructive nature of their death and how long their remains can go undiscovered. If unidentified bodies of service people are returned to their country, formal treatment is required in respect for the decedent.

=== United States ===
In the United States, servicemen from each branch of the military supervise the delivery and other transportation of the remains. While under examination, the unidentified person is placed in a white sheet until they are identified. After the person's body is identified, a funeral and burial takes place in accompaniment of members of the respective branch in which the person served.

== Traditional research methods ==
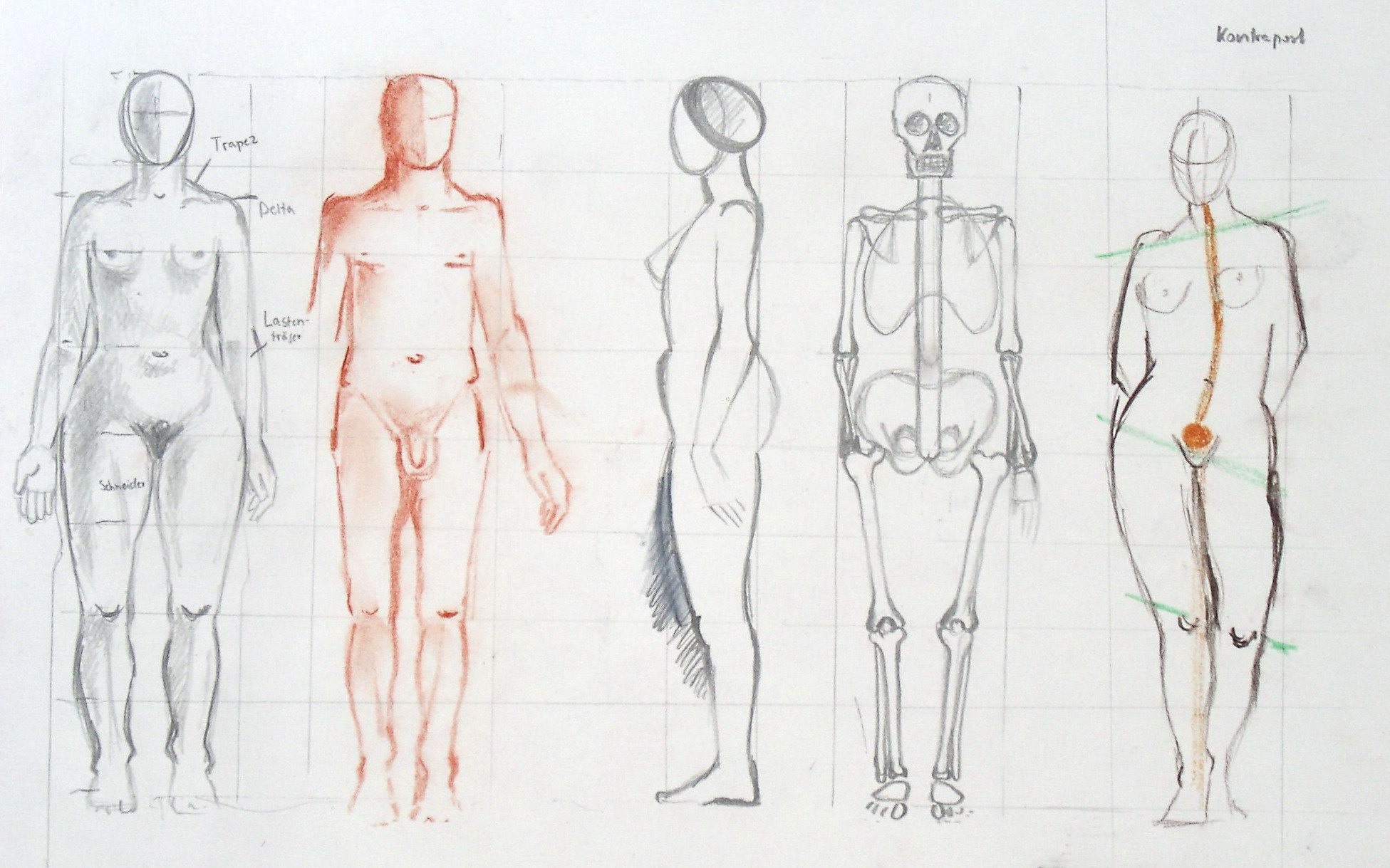
Human body proportions

=== Anthropometry ===
Anthropometry involves examining the size, weight and dimensions of a body. Analysis of the physical aspects can facilitate possible identification before any further scientific procedures take place. This can reduce unnecessary expenses spent on scientific technology. If the results from anthropometric testing are not sufficient, these scientific methods will be employed to increase the accuracy of their identification process.

==== Alphonse Bertillon ====
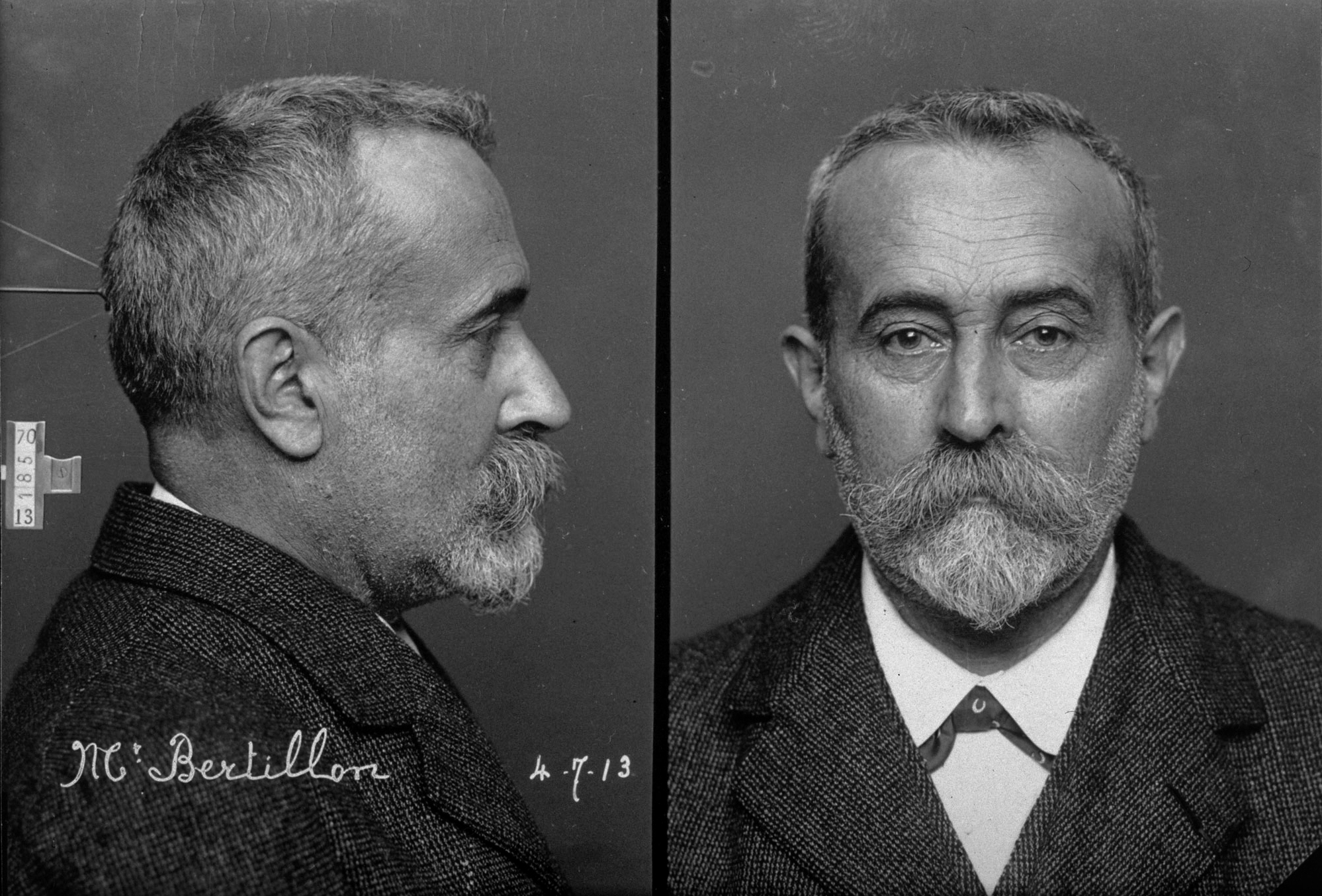
Alphonse Bertillon 1913

Alphonse Bertillon developed the Bertillon System in 1879. This system of identifying a body has three dimensions; anthropometric information, descriptive information and the description of particular marks. The combination of these categories creates a picture of the individual, which scientists attempt to match with their records.

===== Anthropometric information =====
Anthropometric information incorporates the measurement of different body parts, including the head, fingers, feet and arms. The process of obtaining anthropometric information involves the use of different tools. Calliper-compasses are used to measure the dimensions of the head. Sliding compasses are used to measure the "foot, forearm, and middle and little fingers". Small sliding compasses are used to measure the ear. A vertical measure is used to measure for height and a horizontal measure is used to measure for wingspan.

===== Descriptive information =====
Descriptive information includes aspects such as eye colour, hair colour and the structure of the nose. These characteristics can provide forensic scientists with indicators of identity, however, it is possible to find two individuals who have the same or similar anthropometric and descriptive information. Finding peculiarities in the human body, such as particular marks, allows forensic scientists to narrow down their identification process.

===== Description of particular marks =====
The human body has particular marks that provide more specific knowledge to forensic scientists who are attempting to determine the identity of a body. The description of particular marks involves the assessment of unique marks on the body, such as scars and birthmarks. The marks of an individual are characterised by its "nature, direction, dimensions and situation".

==== Influences on anthropometry ====
The process of anthropometry can be impacted by factors that influence the perception of a body, such as sex and gender. The determination of sex is one of the first steps in identifying an individual. The physical differences between the standard male and female bodies act as an indicator of identity in the forensic field. Particular body parts, such as an individual's reproductive organs and the size of their breasts, are an indicator of sex. Other more socially constructed ideas of gender, such as the length of one's hair and the height of an individual, also influence the process of body identification. These assumptions about gender are more complicated in our contemporary society, where intersex and transgender identities are increasingly recognized.

=== Skin ===
The skin provides forensic scientists with ways to identify a body.

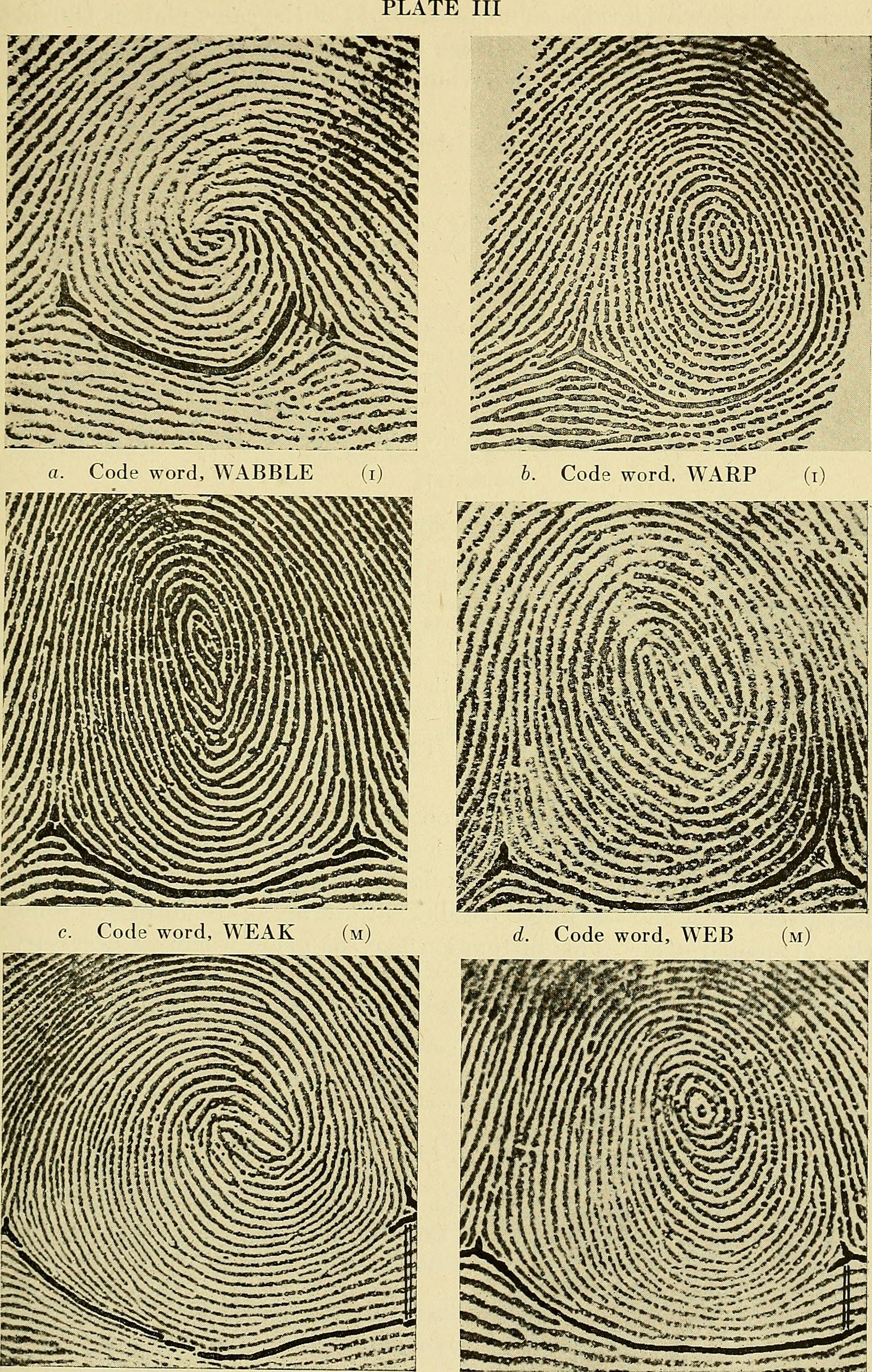
Fingerprint identification

==== Skin prints ====
The skin has a variety of prints that are unique to the individual. Fingerprints are the most common form of print analysis in the process of body identification. The analysis of palm prints is similar to that of fingerprints. However, they also provide information on the dominant hand and age of the individual, which are both key indicators of identity. The hand which has the more deteriorated prints is suggested to be the dominant hand of an individual due to its more frequent use. The size of one's hand can suggest the possible age range of an individual. Ear prints can also be assessed in the process of body identification. Ear printing is the least common method of print analysis due to the ear's malleable nature. The accuracy of skin prints can be influenced by a variety of external factors, such as temperature, humidity, time and "natural skin shedding." These components are considered when using skin prints as a form of identification. If there is any doubt, further scientific research will take place.

==== Skin defects ====
The skin can have defects that help identify a body, including scars, birthmarks, tattoos, moles and blemishes. The nature and location of these defects are particular to the individual.

==== Age ====
The deterioration of skin over time is physically obvious to the eye. A young and fit individual typically has firm and thick skin. However, when individuals age, particularly into their 60s and 70s, their skin is subject to sagging and thinning. The appearance of one's skin can be an indicator of their age, which is a significant characteristic of a person's identity. Sun exposure and lifestyle choices are additional factors that forensic scientists consider alongside age when analysing the appearance of an individual's skin.

==== Gender ====
Gender also affects the perception of one's skin. Common cultural and social constructs can influence a forensic scientist's determination of gender. These include the expectations of facial and body hair and the length of one's nails. These factors are used in conjunction with other scientific identification methods due to its socially constructed nature.

==== Race ====
An individual's race can also act as an indicator of identity. The colour of one's skin is a visual identifier of their race. These assumptions are reinforced by supportive identification documents and other scientific methods.

=== Dental ===
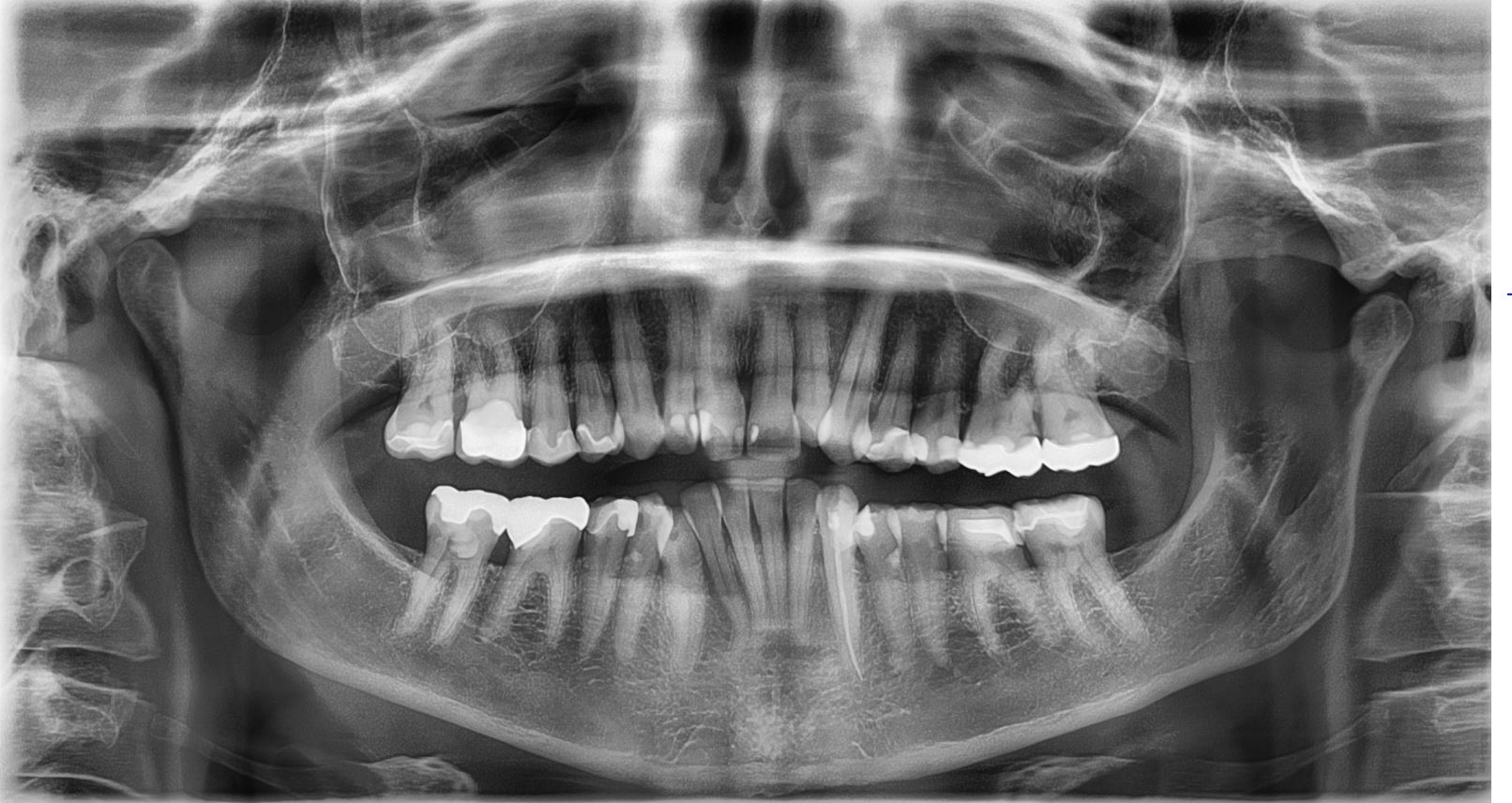
Dental radiograph

Dental examination is a method of body identification that involves the comparison of antemortem and postmortem dental records, such as radiographs and photographs. The jaw is analysed to detect any peculiarities in the teeth or any diseases. In the scenario where skin prints are unable to assist in the process of identification, dental examination can be used. The Forensic Dentistry and Anthropology Center of the Dental Faculty of Piracicaba analysed radiographs and dental records of a "surgically implanted orthopedic plate" to successfully identify a burned body. The success of dental identification can be tainted if the individual has endured a physically traumatic experience that has caused damage to their teeth and jaw. In this scenario, DNA identification is used in the process of body identification.

== Modern research methods ==
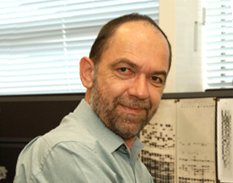
Alec Jeffreys 2008

=== Genetics ===
Alec Jeffreys is known as the "founding father of DNA identification". He invented DNA fingerprinting in the 1980s to assist in the process of body identification. Since then, the method of DNA typing in forensic science has advanced and many techniques to identify microRNA markers in bodily fluids have developed. DNA analysis involves the comparison of DNA profiles and DNA samples. Forensic scientists analyse the impact of time and sensitivity on the appearance of microRNAs when determining how well they can be detected in different bodily fluids. The fluids that are most commonly used in the process of DNA identification are menstrual blood, venous blood, semen, saliva and vaginal secretion.

==== DNA profiling ====
The process of DNA profiling includes DNA extraction, DNA quantification and the use of PCR technology.

===== DNA extraction =====
DNA can be extracted from a variety of samples, but in cases of body identification, they mostly encounter human remains and teeth, which are more resistant to damage and degradation than hair, blood and body tissues. Common methods of DNA extraction include Phenol, Chelex, Silica, and Magnetic beads. The Phenol process is toxic and is "not open to automation". This method is primarily used to extract, from the cells, the nucleic acids necessary for purification. The Chelex process is safe and is "not open to automation". This method connects ions in order to "purify other compounds". This is also the cheapest method. The Silica process is safe and is "open to automation". This method binds DNA molecules with "silica surfaces". This is also the most expensive method. The magnetic beads process is safe and is "open to automation". Following the binding of DNA, this process involves a magnetic field paralysing beads and allowing for the washing of DNA.

===== DNA quantification and PCR technology =====
The extracted DNA must be quantified to "ensure the optimal amount of DNA template is added to a PCR". PCR, Polymerase chain reaction, is the technology used for the purpose of copying particular DNA in a test tube. This method includes three steps; denaturation, annealing, extension.

==== DNA markers ====
DNA markers are used to identify specific DNA characteristics that allow for the distinction between different individuals. These markers are analysed by forensic scientists when identifying an unknown body. DNA markers are either a genotype or a phenotype. A genotype is a set of genes in an organism and a phenotype is an organism's characteristics that are determined by its genes and environment.

==== Next-Generation Sequencing ====
Next-Generation Sequencing (NGS) is the most recent body identification method in the field of genetics. The process of NGS includes three fundamental steps; "library preparation, sequencing, and data interpretation". Its success is due to its ability to "target a larger number of PCR amplicons in a single assay".

==== Genetic Genealogy ====
Genetic Genealogy has been used to identify deceased individuals, unknown suspects as well as living individuals. This method uses Genomics, Computer database technologies, Genealogy and finally Forensic DNA profiling to identify an unknown individual. They start by determining the individual's DNA profile using Single Nucleotide Polymorphisms (SNPs) which is then uploaded onto one or more DNA databases able to match relatives. Some commonly used databases include GEDmatch, FamilyTreeDNA (FTDNA) and D2C databases. Once a relative is identified, closer relatives are better (3rd cousin or closer), genealogists can then determine the family tree using publicly available information, such as birth certificates, death certificates, marriage certificates, obituaries and more. This provides a list of possible candidates that can then be confirmed using Forensic DNA profiling. In cases of deceased individuals, this is usually done through kinship testing with a close living relative.

== See also ==
- Disaster victim identification
- Dump job
- Operation Identify Me
- Unidentified decedent
- Forensic anthropology
