= Anti-theft system =

Loss prevention method

Anti-theft systems protect valuables such as vehicles and personal property like wallets, phones, and jewelry. They are also used in retail settings to protect merchandise in the form of security tags and labels. Anti-theft systems include devices such as locks and keys, RFID tags, and GPS locators.

== Anti-theft ==
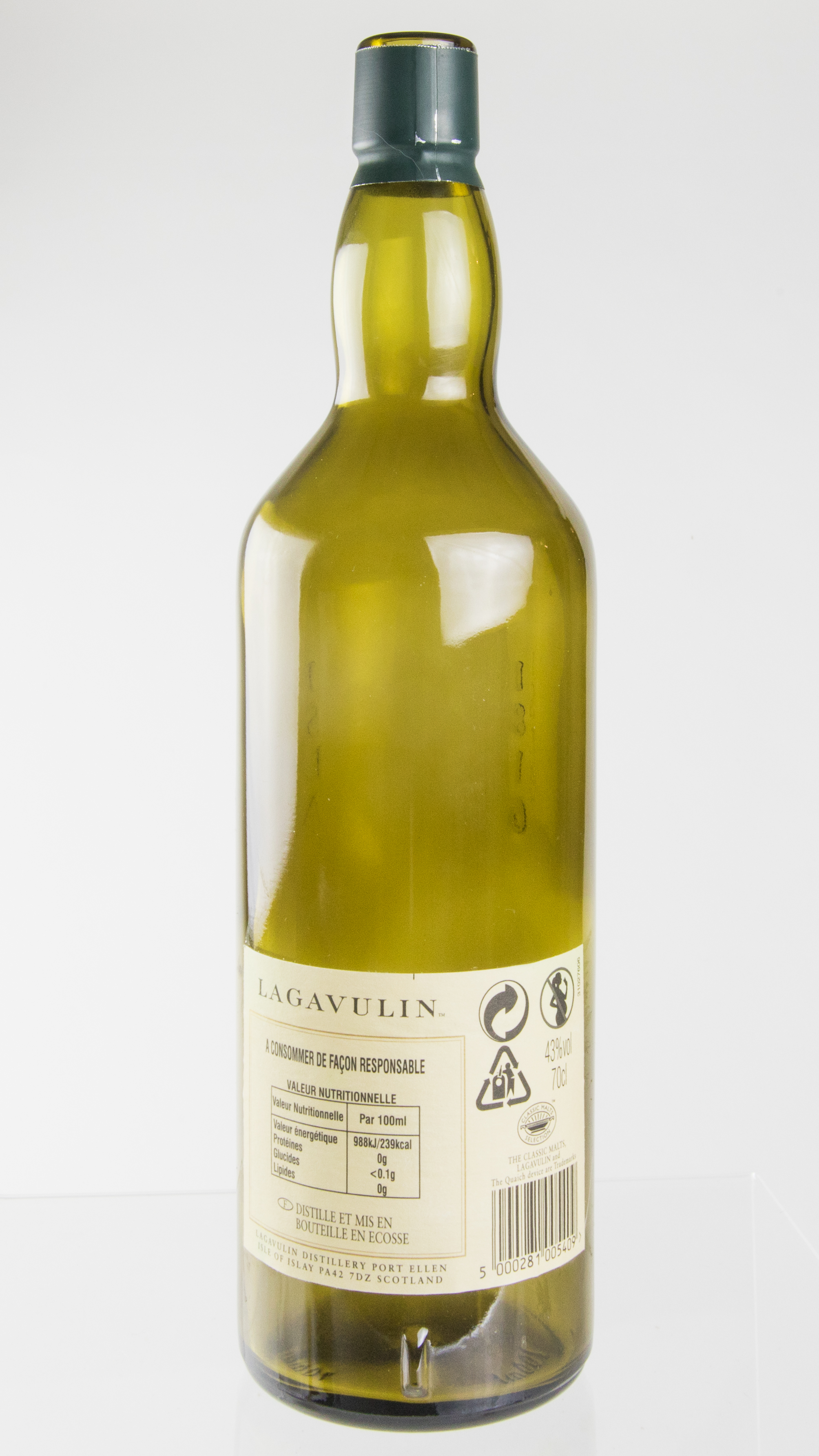
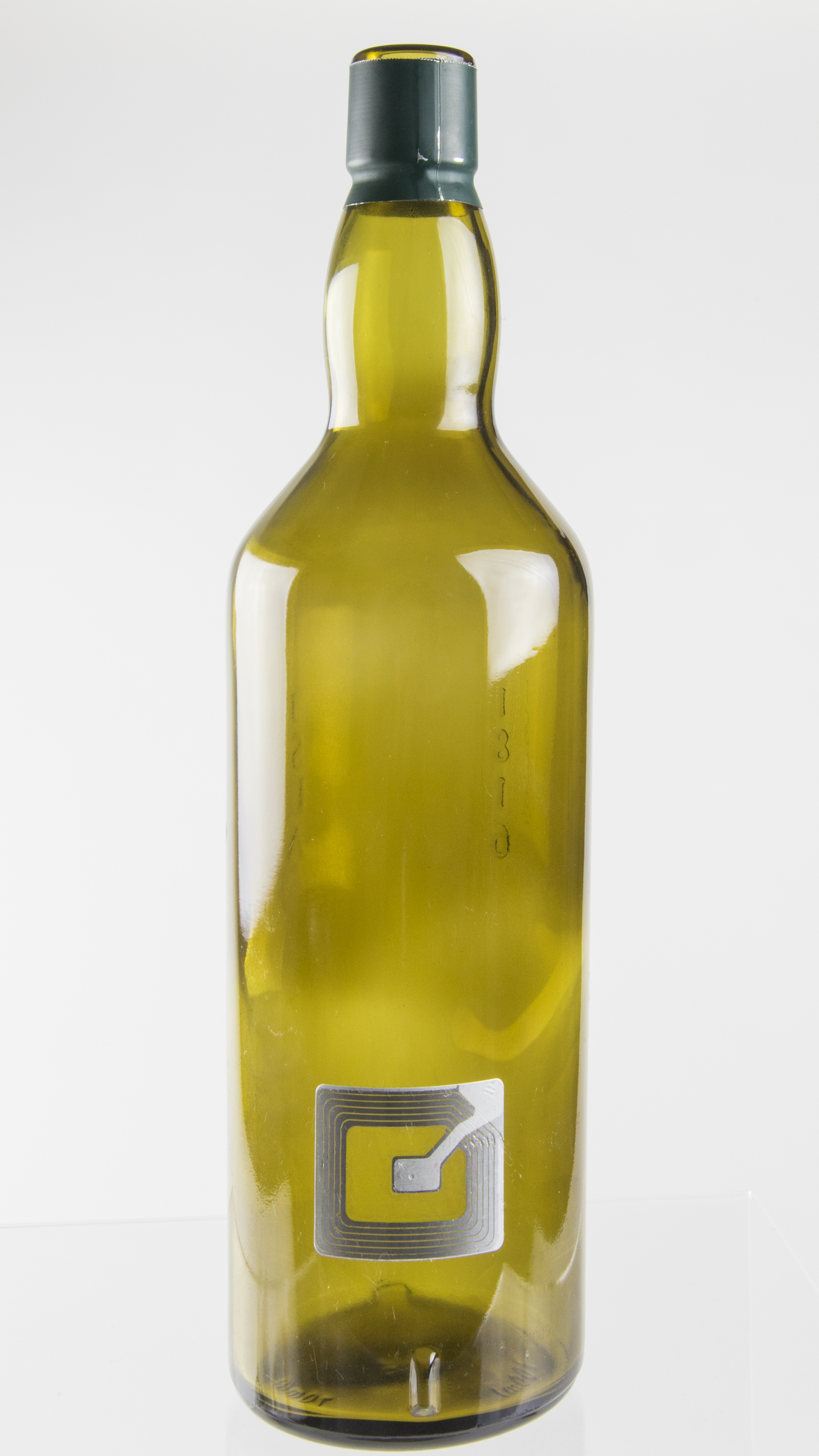
RFID tag concealed beneath the label of a whisky bottle

Under normal circumstances, theft is prevented simply through the application, and social acceptance, of property law. Ownership can be marked using technologies such as vehicle license plates, name tags or RFID.

When clear owner identification is not possible, and when there is a lack of social observance, people may be inclined to take possession of items to their own benefit at the expense of the original owner. Motive and opportunity are two enabling factors for theft. Given that motives for theft are varied and complex, and are, generally speaking, not within the control of the victim, most methods of theft prevention rely on reducing opportunities for theft.

== Motives for actively preventing theft ==
Items may require an anti-theft system for a variety of reasons, which may occur in combination depending on the type of item and its purpose:

- The item is expensive and/or has sentimental value (prestigious car, family heirloom, birthday gift, war medals, coin collection)
- The item is difficult/impossible to replace if lost (produced in low numbers, antiques, unique works of art)
- The item is easy to steal (retail/supermarket products, office stationery)
- The item may be left unattended in an unsafe environment for a certain amount of time (laptop in a library, car in a carpark)
- Improper use of the item may cause considerable damage or encourage further unauthorized actions (theft of car keys, stolen building access keys, identity theft)
- The item is desirable to others (jewelry, mobile phones, rare collectibles, auto parts, industrial designs)
- The item is otherwise unobtainable: (Alcohol, Tobacco products, age related substances)

== Use of theft prevention ==
Equally varied are the methods developed for theft prevention. Anti-theft systems have evolved to counter new theft techniques as they have appeared in society. The choice for a particular anti-theft system is dependent on the following factors:

=== Financial cost ===
In addition to the initial obtainable cost of an item, the cost of replacement or recovery from theft of the item is usually considered when considering the cost of installing an anti-theft system. This cost estimation usually determines the maximum cost of the anti-theft system and the need to secure it. Expensive items will generally be secured with a higher cost anti-theft system, while low-cost items will generally be secured at a lower cost. Insurance companies will often mandate a minimum type of anti-theft system as part of the conditions for insurance.

=== Threshold for theft ===
Anti-theft systems are designed to raise the difficulty of theft to an infeasible (but not necessarily impossible) level. The kind of system implemented often depends on the acceptable threshold for theft. For example, keeping money in an inside shirt pocket increases the difficulty of theft above that necessary if the pocket were on a backpack, since unauthorized access is made sufficiently more difficult. Methods of theft evolve to decrease the difficulty of theft, increased by newer anti-theft systems. Because of evolution on both sides and the social aspect of theft, the threshold for theft is very dynamic and heavily dependent on the environment. Doors in quiet suburban neighborhoods are often left unlocked, as the perceived thresholds for theft are very high.

=== Ease of use ===
Security is often compromised through the lax application of theft-prevention practices and human nature in general. The average anti-theft device does not require any additional effort while using the secured item, without reducing the level of security. In practice, users of security systems may intentionally reduce the effectiveness of an anti-theft system to increase its usability. For example, a home security system will usually be enabled and disabled with an easy-to-remember code such as "1111" or "1234", instead of a more secure combination.

== Methods of theft prevention ==
There are a number of general categories of anti-theft systems:

=== Sequestering of valuable items ===
A very common method of preventing theft is the placement of valuables in a safe location. The definition of safe depends on the minimum threshold for theft as determined by the owner. Desk stationery is often considered to be secured if placed in an unlocked drawer away from view, while expensive jewelry might be placed in a safe behind a picture in a home.

=== Raising the awareness of theft ===
Another common method is the alerting of other individuals to the act of theft. This is commonly seen in department stores, where security systems at exits alert store employees of the removal of unpaid items. Older car alarms also fall into this category; newer systems also prevent the car from starting or raise an SOS alarm if ever the tracking device is detached from the car or valuable asset. The revolution of mobile applications and wireless communication make possible to get notified by your phone, when your properties are stolen. Probably the first solution of mobile application based theft detection is BluCop, which was published in December 2010.

=== Preventing removal of items ===
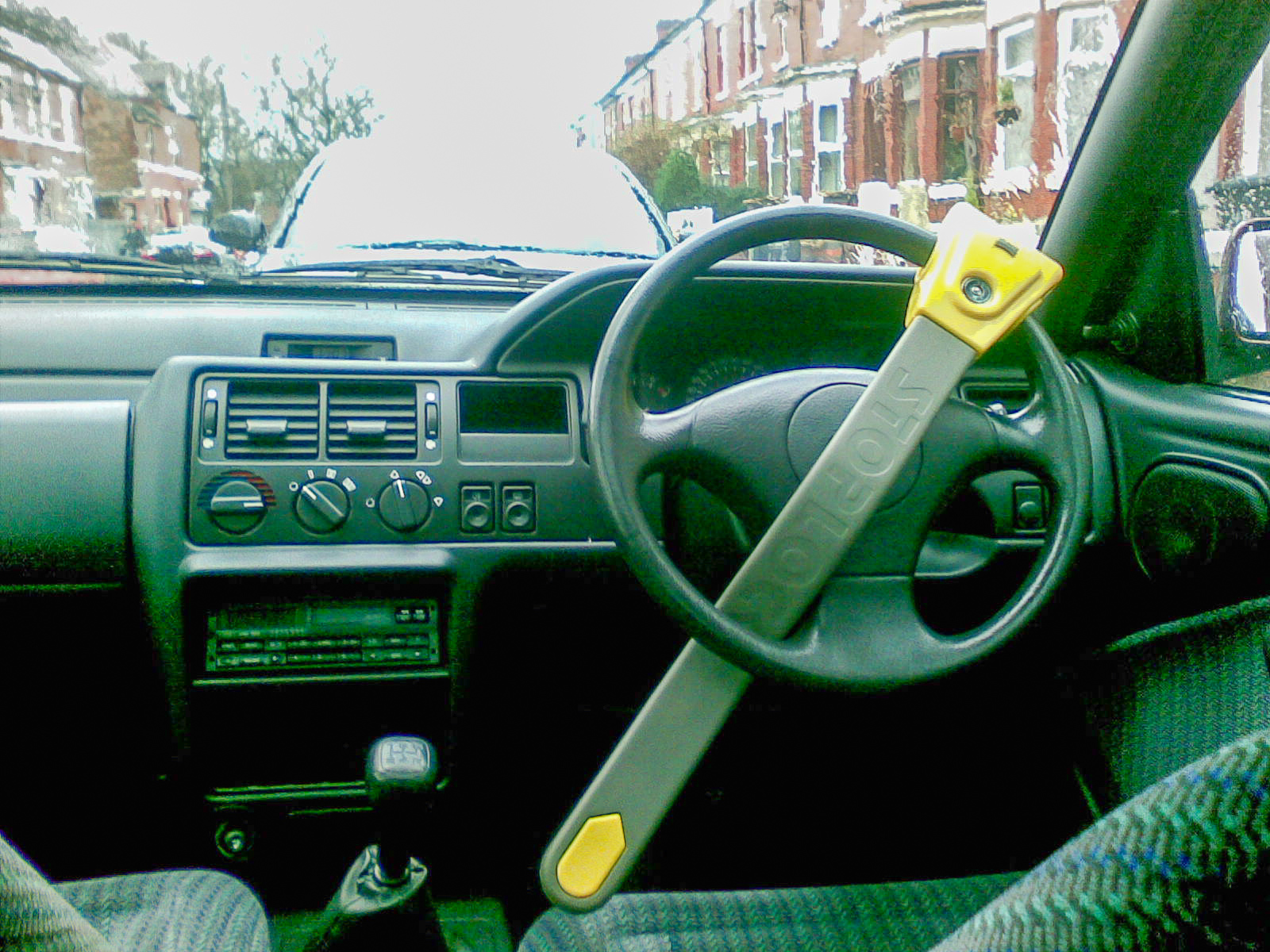
A steering wheel lock in a car

Valuable items may be attached to a larger immobile object, usually furniture or walls. Large vehicles may also be locked in such a way to prevent them being operated.

=== Disabling the stolen item ===
Items with specific functionality can often be disabled to prevent use of the item should it be stolen. The anti-theft system can require disabling on every use, or enabling when the item should be secured. Disabling the anti-theft system is usually done by requiring identification of the owner at some stage of use. Identification can occur physically or through other methods (physical keys, numerical codes, complex passwords, biometric identification). This can work even retrospectively—‌given that a stolen credit card can easily be invalidated with a phone call to the issuing bank, the motivation to steal one is reduced.

In the case of vehicle theft, the best deterrent to theft is in the installation of an approved vehicle anti-theft passive immobilizer. Many vehicles have factory-installed anti-theft units, which provide protection through the ignition system. Under the hood there is a computer that controls the operation of the engine. It is programmed to verify that the RFID tag attached to the key is correct before the engine control module will allow ignition to occur. An approved immobilizer uses a three circuit isolation system which can thwart even an experienced thief.

=== Security tags ===
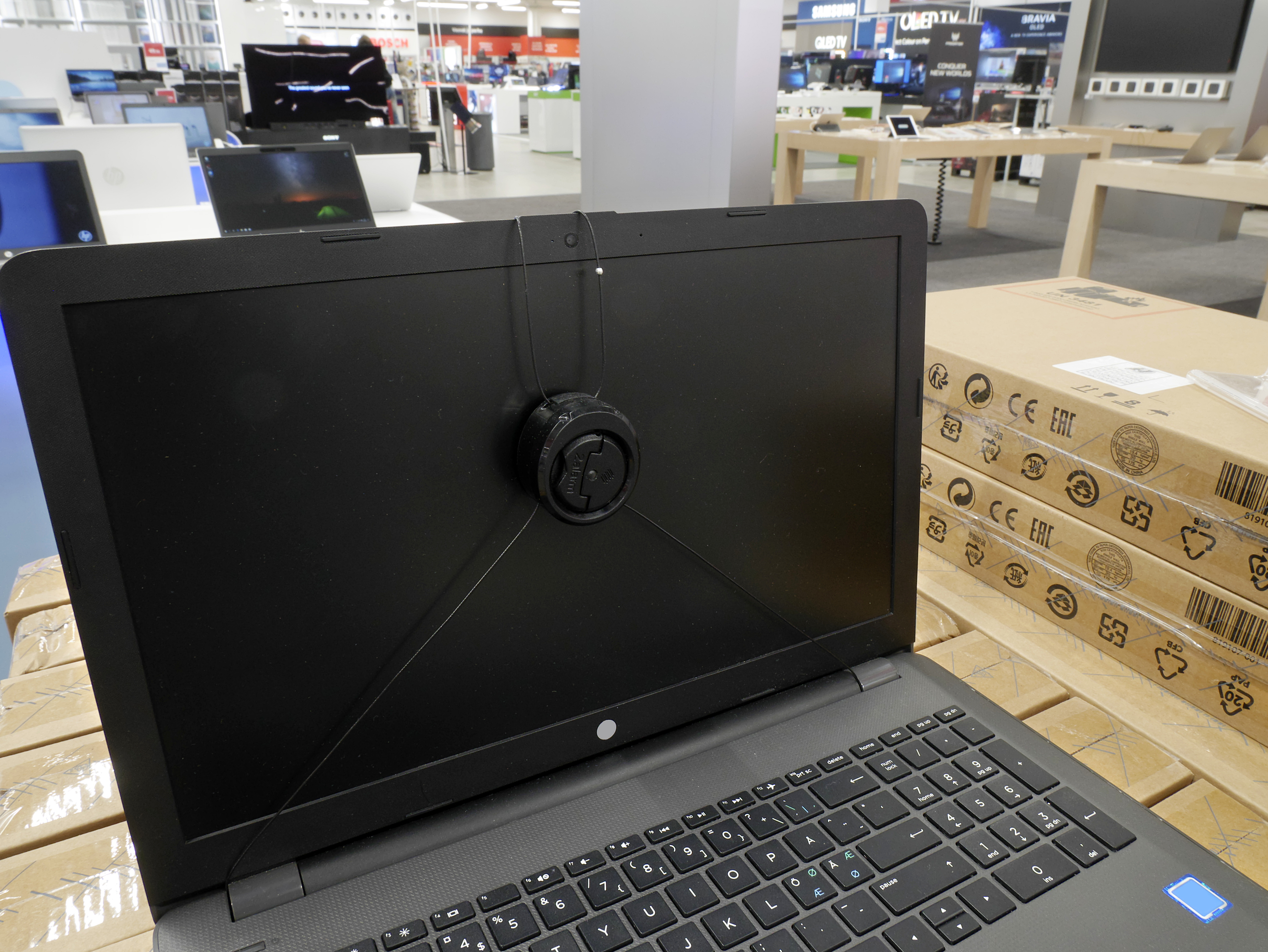
Anti-theft tag on a laptop in a store

Security tags are devices that are attached to products to prevent shoplifting and are often used in conjunction with an electronic article surveillance system. SelectaDNA or SmartWater are such security tags - a forensic fluid which contains millions of tiny fragments which have a unique number called "SIN" ("SelectaDNA identification number"), and registered in a national police database together with the owner's details, is etched into each of those particles.

=== Tracking software ===
Electronic devices such as laptops, cell phones and even gadgets such as iPods now have software that enable them to "phone home" with information regarding their whereabouts and other information that can assist law enforcement in tracking down the devices.

=== Forensic marking ===
Assets can be marked with various forensic marking materials for law enforcement tracking of the item. Examples of this type of marking include SelectaDNA and Smartwater.

== See also ==
- Danish bicycle VIN-system
- Ketan Kadam § Invention
