= SmartWater =

Forensic asset marking system

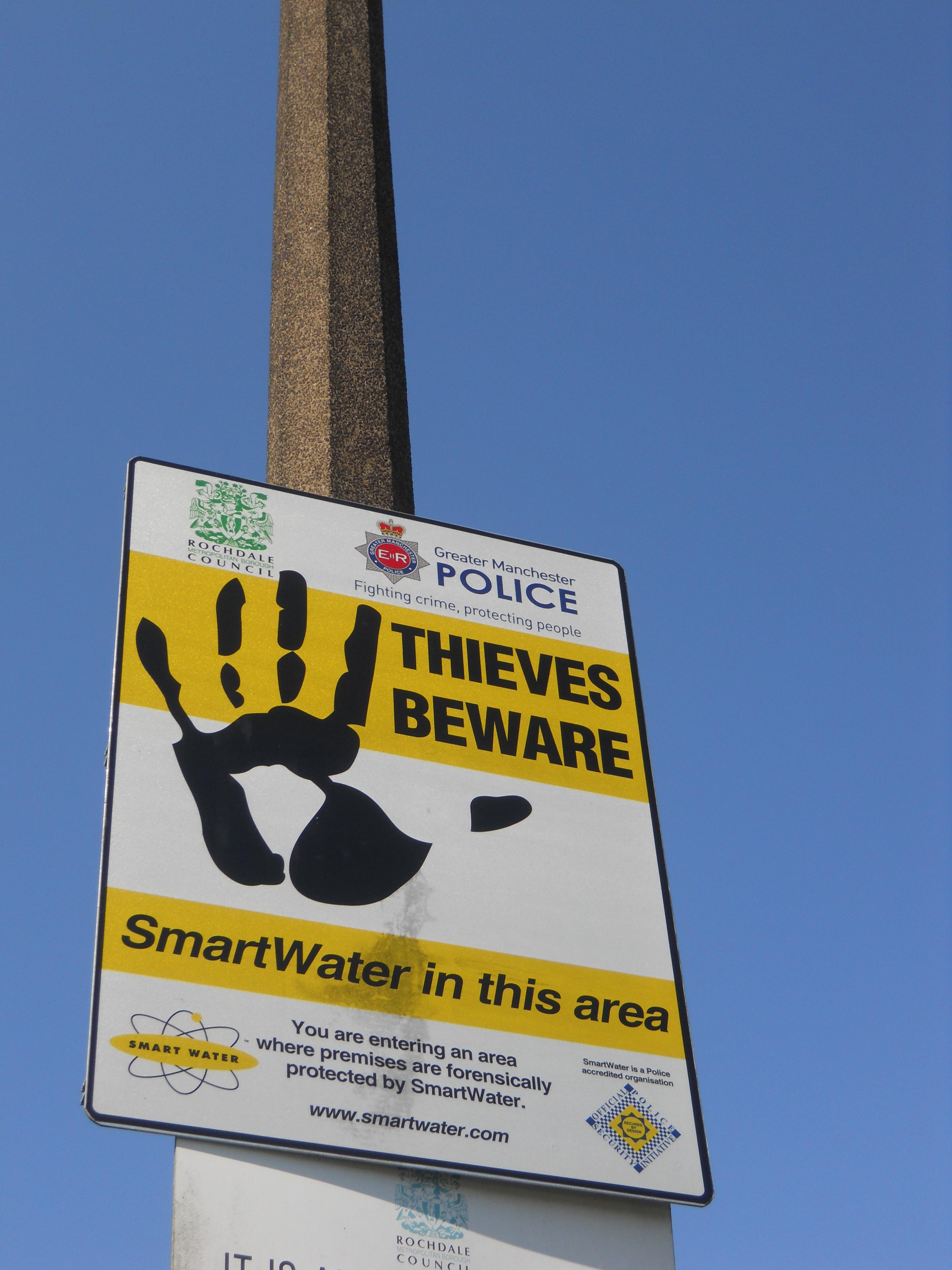
Greater Manchester Police SmartWater warning sign

SmartWater is a traceable liquid and forensic asset marking system (taggant), applied to items of value to identify thieves, and deter theft. The liquid leaves a unique identifier, whose presence "cannot be easily seen by the naked eye" except under ultraviolet black light.

== History ==
SmartWater, the forensic technology company, was started in the early 1990s by Phil Cleary. Phil's brother, Mike Cleary, a Chartered Chemist and a Fellow of the Royal Society of Chemistry, created SmartWater, and was responsible for technology development, whereas Phil Cleary looked after the business side of things.

In 1996, SmartWater gained a national profile when the Clearys won the Prince of Wales Award for the product with the most commercial potential on BBC's Tomorrow's World.

From 2016 to 2019, SmartWater initiated an M&A program, which culminated in the acquisition of PID Systems Ltd in Prestwick, Scotland. This led to the formation of the SmartWater Group Limited, comprising SmartWater Technology Limited, PID Systems Ltd, the SmartWater Foundation Ltd, and the Centre for Infrastructure and Asset Protection, the company's intelligence arm that provides crime pattern analysis for the UK police service.

== Composition ==
SmartWater is a clear, water-based, liquid containing an identifying code that can be viewed under ultraviolet light. It is intended to be applied to valuable items, including those at construction sites, in retail stores, and in vacant residential or commercial properties. It can also be used to spray a thief with liquid to generate evidence that connects a suspect to a specific location. If the items are stolen and later recovered by police, the code can be read in a laboratory to identify the original owner.

SmartWater comes in three variants: "Index Solutions", "Indsol Tracer" and "SmartWater Instant", which use different techniques to embed such a code. According to Phil Cleary, this allows "millions of chemical signatures" and, in terms of its use as an asset protection system, is an identifier superior to DNA fingerprinting.

1. Index Solutions variants are water-based solutions containing low-level additives, which are blended using a binary sequence to ensure uniqueness. The Index Solution is contained within a spray system that is activated by an intruder detection unit, similar to a burglar alarm, and marks the intruder with a spray, which the police locate using a black (UV) light.
2. Indsol Tracer variants consist of polymer emulsion that blends different chemical agents according to a binary code allowing billions of different possibilities.
3. SmartWater Instant variants consist mainly of a copolymer of vinyl acetate in isopropyl alcohol. The fluid contains millions of tiny fragments; a unique number called "SIN" ("SmartWater identification number," registered in a national police database together with the owner's details) is encoded into each of those particles.

== Uses and effectiveness ==
In a 2006 speech to security professionals at the NEC in Birmingham, CEO Phil Cleary stated, "Property marking initiatives are a waste of time and public money unless they're accompanied by an underlying strategy aimed at creating a sustainable deterrent." Cleary went on to suggest that criminals would not be deterred by technology unless it had a successful track record of securing convictions in the criminal courts. The SmartWater company developed a crime reduction program, called "The SmartWater Strategy".

In 2008, a research paper on the efficacy of SmartWater was published by a team led by Professor Martin Gill. Gill interviewed criminals and asked whether the presence of SmartWater would deter them from burglary, with 74% saying it would. The paper was later criticized; according to an academic study carried out by the Centre for Operational Police Research, University of Warwick, the research paper was not an academic study, was paid for by the company, and had an unclear methodology.

In 2012, SmartWater presented its strategy to officers of the Metropolitan Police, who decided to test SmartWater's concept under controlled conditions. Consequently, a 'proof of concept' trial was initiated in 2013. SmartWater operated in the London Borough of Brent and, following six months of formal assessment, announced an 85% reduction in household burglary.

In their study, the Centre for Operational Police Research said that the 'proof of concept trial' suffered from the same deficiencies as the paper by Professor Martin Gill. They added that the use of SmartWater may not be causal in the reduction in burglaries which could be explained by an increase in police resources in the area.

In 2017, SmartWater became accredited as being compliant with the UK Government's Forensic Science Regulator's Codes of Practice, which became a lawful requirement in April 2021.

SmartWater is accredited by the United Kingdom Accreditation Service (UKAS) for the forensic analysis of SmartWater products. It is the company's testing facilities and processes that are accredited, not their products.

== Founders ==
Mike Cleary fully retired when Freshstream joined the company and Phil Cleary stayed as CEO for eighteen months to aid the integration process, until retiring in December 2021.

Phil Cleary became a Fellow of the Royal Society of Arts in 2009.

== See also ==
- Alphadot
- DNA marking
- Invisible ink
- Perfluorocarbon tracer
- SelectaDNA
