= Millwall brick =

Hand-held weapon improvised from newspaper

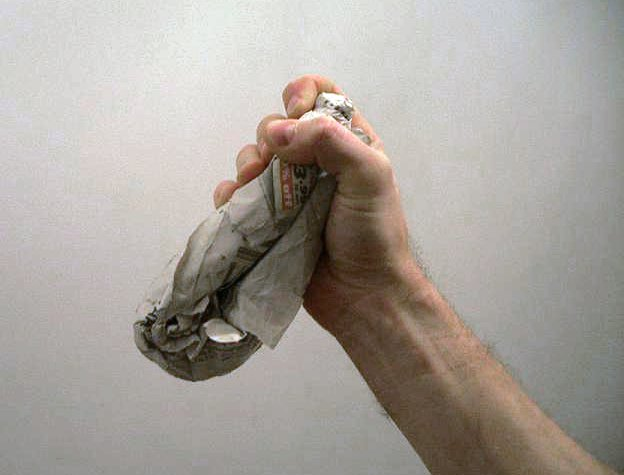
- Folded newspaper held in a fist
- Type: Blunt hand-held weapon, Improvised weapon
- Place of origin: England

Service history
- Used by: hooligans, prisoners and martial artists

Specifications
- Head type: Rolled and folded paper
- Haft type: Rolled paper

A Millwall brick or bat is an improvised weapon made of a manipulated newspaper, used as a small club. It was named after supporters of Millwall F.C., who have a reputation for football hooliganism. The Millwall brick was allegedly used as a stealth weapon at football matches in England during the 1960s and 1970s. The weapon's popularity appears to have been due to the wide availability of newspapers, the difficulty in restricting newspapers being brought into football grounds, and the ease of its construction.

== History ==
In the late 1960s, in response to football hooliganism at matches in England, police began confiscating any objects that could be used as weapons. These items included steel combs, pens, beermats, horse brasses, Polo mints, shoelaces and boots.

However, fans were still permitted to bring in newspapers. Larger broadsheet newspapers work best for a Millwall brick, and the police looked with suspicion at working class football fans who carried such newspapers. Because of their more innocent appearance, tabloid newspapers became the preferred choice for Millwall bricks.

The book Spirit of '69: A Skinhead Bible describes the use of Millwall bricks by British football hooligans in the late 1960s: "Newspapers were rolled up tightly to form the so-called Millwall Brick and another trick was to make a knuckleduster out of pennies held in place by a wrapped around paper. You could hardly be pulled up for having a bit of loose change in your pocket and a Daily Mirror under your arm." The book Skinhead says, "The Millwall brick, for example, was a newspaper folded again and again and squashed together to form a cosh."

In 1978, the weapon gained wider recognition when the Daily Mirror ran a story on its use by Chelsea FC hooligans in the then notorious Shed End of Stamford Bridge. An editorial in a 1978 Brentford FC matchday programme, bemoaning the impact of football hooliganism on the game, noted that Stoke City FC "had banned young supporters carrying newspapers into the Victoria Ground after fighting on the terraces during which the Millwall Brick was seen in action".

== Design ==
A Millwall brick is constructed from several newspaper sheets stacked and tightly rolled lengthwise. The resulting tube is then bent in half to create a handle (a haft) and a rounded head at the fold.

== Cultural references ==
- The term "Millwall brick" appeared in a 2001 Times column about the September 11, 2001 attacks, in which writer Mick Hume sarcastically proposed that airlines get rid of newspapers since "football hooligans used to fold them into something called a Millwall Brick."
- The Millwall brick was mentioned in a 2004 Spiked column about Britain's "knife culture".
- A 2004 column in the New York Sports Express (NYSX) includes an expression of hope that Millwall F.C. would "upset Manchester United and put the infamous Millwall Brick inside the famous FA Cup."
- A skinhead reggae zine series, Millwall Brick, addressed topics such as the film The Harder They Come, Motown Records and football.
- The 1994 CD Chello, by Irish pop/rock band Blink includes the song, "Millwall Brick Mix".
- In 1995, guitarists Doug Aldrich and his hard rock band Bad Moon Rising released an extended play CD entitled Millwall Brick.
- In the film The Bourne Supremacy, Jason Bourne (Matt Damon) fashioned a similar weapon out of a magazine.
- In the TV show Lilyhammer (season 2, episode 1), Duncan Hammer (Paul Kaye) produced a Millwall Brick out of the Norwegian tabloid newspaper VG, some coins and his own urine while ranting about how he [the character] and his fellow football hooligans invented it to circumvent the police's weapon prohibition on football matches back in England.
- On an episode of The Modern Rogue, Brian Brushwood and his friend Jason Murphy created a Millwall brick using the basic principles of the weapon. Afterwards, the two created a more effective and deadlier version of it by rolling the newspaper into an even tighter roll, wrapped it in packing tape, folding the roll, and then inserting a flat stone into the gap in the fold before taping it a final time, effectively making the Millwall Brick into a crude tomahawk.

== See also ==
- Millwall Bushwackers
- Clubs
- Personal weapons
- Self-defense
- Street fighting
- Ultras
- Association football culture
- Football hooliganism
