= Forensic identification =

Legal identification of specific objects and materials

Forensic identification is the application of forensic science, or "forensics", and technology to identify specific objects from the trace evidence they leave, often at a crime scene or the scene of an accident. Forensic means "for the courts".

== Human identification ==
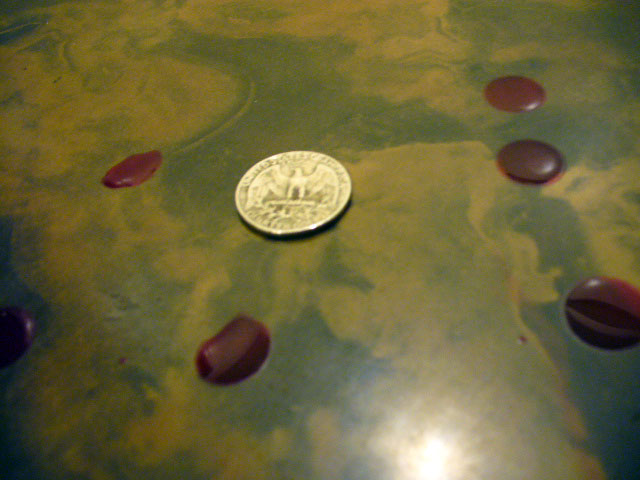
Droplets of human blood next to a quarter. In addition to analyzing for DNA, the droplets are round and show no spattering, indicating they impacted at a relatively slow velocity, in this case from a height of two feet.

People can be identified by their fingerprints. This assertion is supported by the philosophy of friction ridge identification, which states that friction ridge identification is established through the agreement of friction ridge formations, in sequence, having sufficient uniqueness to individualize.

Friction ridge identification is also governed by four premises or statements of facts:

1. Friction ridges develop on the fetus in their definitive form prior to birth.
2. Friction ridges are persistent throughout life except for permanent scarring, disease, or decomposition after death.
3. Friction ridge paths and the details in small areas of friction ridges are unique and never repeated.
4. Overall, friction ridge patterns vary within limits which allow for classification.

People can also be identified from traces of their DNA from blood, skin, hair, saliva, and semen by DNA fingerprinting, from their ear print, from their teeth or bite by forensic odontology, from a photograph or a video recording by facial recognition systems, from the video recording of their walk by gait analysis, from an audio recording by voice analysis, from their handwriting by handwriting analysis, from the content of their writings by their writing style (e.g. typical phrases, factual bias, and/or misspellings of words), or from other traces using other biometric techniques. Many methods that are used in forensic science evidence have been proven to be unreliable. A lot of trials have been reviewed and testimony involving mostly microscopic hair comparison, but also bite mark, shoe print, soil, fiber, and fingerprint comparisons have been overturned because forensic analysts have provided invalid testimony at the trial.

Since forensic identification has been first introduced to the courts in 1980, the first exoneration due to DNA evidence was in 1989 and there have been 336 additional exonerations since then. Those who specialize in forensic identification continue to make headway with new discoveries and technological advances to make convictions more accurate.

Body identification is a subfield of forensics concerned with identifying someone from their remains, usually from fingerprint analysis, dental analysis, or DNA analysis.

=== Foot creases ===
Feet also have friction ridges like fingerprints do. Friction ridges have been widely accepted as a form of identification with fingerprints but not entirely with feet. Feet have creases which remain over time due to the depth it reaches in the dermal layer of the skin, making them permanent. These creases are valuable when individualizing the owner. The concept of no two fingerprints are alike is also applied to foot creases. Foot creases can grow as early as 13 weeks after conception when the volar pads begin to grow and when the pads regress, the creases remain. When foot crease identification is used in a criminal case, it should be used in conjunction with morphology and friction ridges to ensure precise identification. There is record of foot crease identification used in a criminal case to solve a murder. Sometimes with marks left by the foot with ink, blood, mud, or other substances, the appearance of creases or ridges become muddled or extra creases may appear due to cracked skin, folded skin, or fissures. In order to truly compare morphological feature, the prints of feet must be clear enough to distinguish between individuals.

=== Downfalls ===
The two basic conceptual foundations of forensic identification are that everyone is individualized and unique. This individualization belief was invented by a police records clerk, Alphonse Bertillon, based on the idea that "nature never repeats," originating from the father of social statistics, Lambert Adolphe Jacques Quetelet. The belief was passed down through generations being generally accepted, but it was never scientifically proven. There was a study done intending to show that no two fingerprints were the same, but the results were inconclusive. Many modern forensic and evidentiary scholars collectively agree that individualization to one object, such as a fingerprint, bite mark, handwriting, or ear mark is not possible. In court cases, forensic scientists can fall victim to observer bias when not sufficiently blinded to the case or results of other pertinent tests. This has happened in cases like United States v. Green and State v. Langill. Also, the proficiency tests that forensic analysts must do are often not as demanding to be considered admissible in court.

=== Primary methods ===
According to Interpol, there are 3 primary methods to human identification: Friction Ridge Analysis, Forensic Odontology, and DNA Analysis.

==== Friction ridge analysis ====
Fingerprints from the hands and feet are unique and remain unchanged (unless major external factors are involved) from birth to death. Even with minor injuries, they regenerate following the same pattern.

Considering the existence of databases in states and countries worldwide containing records of fingerprints from their residents, there is the possibility of searching and comparing fingerprints. This enables an accurate comparison for victim identification.

==== Odontology analysis ====
Forensic odontology (dentistry) plays an important role in human identification, especially in cases where individuals are in an advanced stage of decomposition, charred, or skeletonized. This is due to the high resistance of teeth, which can remain intact even after exposure to harsh conditions.

Considering that many people have visited a dentist and have dental records, there is the possibility of retrieving this data for comparison with post-mortem examination data. Such a method enables quick, cost-effective, and reliable identification.

The most commonly used ante-mortem data are dental X-rays, dental models, and dental records. However, these data rely on the existence of dental records registered by a dentist. Nevertheless, even if a person does not have such records, a photograph of their smile or an old dental prosthesis can be used for comparison.

==== DNA identification ====
Forensic DNA analysis can be a useful tool in aiding forensic identification because DNA is found in almost all cells of the body except mature red blood cells. Deoxyribonucleic acid is located in two different places of the cell, the nucleus; which is inherited from both parents, and the mitochondria; inherited maternally. As with fingerprints, an individual's DNA profile and characteristics are unique. Forensic identification using DNA can be useful in different cases such as determining suspects in violent crimes, solving paternity/maternity, and identifying human remains of victims from mass disasters or missing person cases. It is also used to link suspects or victims to each other or to crime scenes. When a sample is located at a crime scene, it must be collected, processed, and transported, along with a chain of custody, to the laboratory for analysis, so that if a DNA profile is generated it can be accepted in court. Proper evidence collection and preservation is crucial to ensure evidence is not being contaminated. Main procedures investigators must use when packaging biological material is allowing the evidence to air dry and then package into paper bags. Plastic bags should never be used on biological evidence because it could degrade DNA or lead to bacterial growth.

DNA can be sourced from biological material such as semen, blood, saliva, feces, urine, teeth, bone, and hair that is left behind from an individual. There are different presumptive and confirmatory tests used for each type of biological material found at a scene. Presumptive tests are quick, sensitive and are relatively specific to bodily fluids that give the analyst an idea of what might be present. Confirmatory tests confirm what the biological sample is. In addition to looking for biological material at a crime scene, pieces of evidence can also be examined and analyzed for the presence of DNA. Evidence pieces that may have the presence of DNA could include clothing, bedding, weapons, masks, gloves, among many others. This is attributed to touch DNA, where only minute samples are left after an object has been touched. It is defined as "evidence with no visible staining that would likely contain DNA resulting from the transfer of epithelial cells from the skin to an object." A forensic scientist can attempt to obtain a DNA profile from the sample with as few as six cells.

The first step in the DNA process with a piece of evidence is extraction. Extraction is a technique used to remove the DNA from the cell. The next step would be quantification which determines how much DNA is present. The third step is amplification in order to yield multiple copies of DNA. Next is separation, to separate the DNA out to use for identification. Finally, the analyst can now complete analysis and interpretation of the DNA sample and compare to known profiles.

An unknown sample found at a crime scene is called a questioned sample. A known sample can be taken either from a suspect or found in a database. The FBI's database used for DNA is CODIS, Combined DNA Index System. It has data at three levels: local, state, and national. The national level data is stored in NDIS, National DNA Index system. CODIS/NDIS allows analysts to compare their questioned DNA profile among those of arrestees, convicted offenders, and other unknown samples to try and produce investigative leads. If questioned and known samples are similar, statistics and interpretation will then be completed. The DNA profile will be compared to a population database and a random match probability will be determined. Random match probability is defined as the chance that an individual selected randomly from a population will have an identical DNA profile to the markers tested. If they do not equal each other, they are not a match, termed exclusion.

During DNA typing, several markers are examined, termed loci. When more markers are examined, this could result in either a greater probability that two unrelated individuals will have different genotypes or adds to the confidence of connecting an individual to an unknown sample. One locus difference between a questioned and known sample is enough to exclude that suspect as the contributor.

The FBI has identified 13 core STR loci that are effective for human identification. STR is short tandem repeats which are short DNA regions in the genome and are 2–6 base pairs in length. STR is common in forensic analysis because they are easily amplified using polymerase chain reaction (PCR) and they have unique variation among individuals for human identification. PCR is the technique of copying DNA by making millions of copies. When all 13 core loci are tested on a DNA profile, the random match probability is more than one in a trillion.

Since DNA was first used in a criminal investigation in 1986, it has aided investigators to solve many cases. DNA profiling is one of the most important tools in forensics and continued research will increase its ability and accuracy to provide more techniques for the future.

== Animal identification ==
=== Wildlife forensics ===
There are many different applications for wildlife forensics and below are only some of the procedures and processes used to distinguish species.

The importance of species identification is most prominent in animal populations that are illegally hunted, harvested, and traded, such as rhinoceroses, lions, and African elephants. In order to distinguish which species is which, mtDNA, or mitochondrial DNA, is the most used genetic marker because it is easier to type from highly decomposed and processed tissue compared to nuclear DNA. Additionally, the mitochondrial DNA has multiple copies per cell, which is another reason it's frequently used. When nuclear DNA is used, certain segments of the strands are amplified in order to compare those to segments of mitochondrial DNA. This comparison is used to figure out related genes and species proximity since distant relatives of animals are closer in proximity in the gene tree. That being said, the comparison process demands precision because mistakes can easily be made due to genes evolving and mutating in the evolution of species.

Determining the origin of a certain species aids research in population numbers and lineage data. Phylogenetic studies are most often used to find the broad geographic area of which a species reside. For example, in California seahorses were being sold for traditional medicinal purposes and the phylogenetic data of those seahorses led researchers to find their origin and from which population they came from and what species they were. In addition to phylogenetic data, assignment tests are used to find the probability of a species belonging to or originating from a specific population and genetic markers of a specimen are utilized. These types of tests are most accurate when all potential population's data have been gathered. Statistical analyses are used in assignment tests based on an individual's microsatellites or Amplified Fragment Length Polymorphisms (AFLPs). Using microsatellites in these studies is more favorable than AFLPs because the AFLPs required non-degraded tissue samples and higher errors have been reported when using AFLPs.

=== Domestic animal forensics ===
Domestic animals such as dogs and cats can be utilized to help solve criminal cases. These can include homicides, sexual assaults, or robberies. DNA evidence from dogs alone have helped over 20 criminal cases in Great Britain and the U.S. since 1996. However, there are very few laboratories that are able to process and analyze evidence or data from domestic animals. Forensics can be used in animal attacks as well. In cases such as dog attacks, the hair, blood, and saliva surrounding the wounds a victim has can be analyzed to find a match for the attacker. In the competitive realm, DNA analysis is used in many cases to find illegal substances in racehorses by urine samples and comparisons of STRs.

== Product identification ==
- Color copiers and maybe some color computer printers steganographically embed their identification number as a countermeasure against currency forgeries.
- Copiers and computer printers can be potentially identified by the minor variants of the way they feed the paper through the printing mechanism, leaving banding artifacts. Analysis of the toners is also used.
- Documents are characterized by the composition of their paper and ink.
- Firearms can be identified by the striations on the bullets they fired and imprints on the cartridge casings.
- Paper shredders can be potentially identified in a similar way, by spacing and wear of their blades.
- Photo identification is used to detect and identify forged digital photos.
- Typewriters can be identified by minor variations of positioning and wear of their letters.
- Illegal drugs can be identified by which color it turns when a reagent is added during a color test. Gas Chromatography, Infrared Spectrometry or Mass Spectrometry is used in combination with the color test to identify the type of drug.

== Networks ==
- Cars can be automatically found on CCTV records by automatic number plate recognition.
- Computers connected to the Internet can often be identified by their IP address or MAC address.
- Radio transceivers can be potentially identified by minute variations of their output signal.
- Social networks can be discovered by network analysis of banking, telecommunication and postal records.

== Applications ==
Sometimes, manufacturers and film distributors may intentionally leave subtle forensic markings on their products to identify them in case of piracy or involvement in a crime. (Cf. watermark, digital watermark, steganography. DNA marking.)

== Organizations ==
- Association of Firearm and Tool Mark Examiners
- Canadian Identification Society
- International Association for Identification

== See also ==
- Biometric identification
- Computer forensics
- Data remanence
- Digital traces
- Entomological evidence collection
- Forensic anthropology
- Forensic dentistry (odontology)
- Forensic engineering
- Forensic profiling
- Forensic science
- Trace evidence
- Questioned Document Examination
