= DNA marking =

DNA marking is a type of forensic identification. It is a method to mark items in a way that is undetectable to the naked eye. A unique DNA marker is applied to the item, and can be recovered to identify the item. In suspected thefts, the suspect can also be tested for traces of the DNA marking. DNA marking can be used to prevent thefts of objects that are hard to mark in any other way (e.g. copper cables). It can also be used to help separate between genuine and counterfeit electronics and other replacement parts.
