= Entomological evidence collection =

Collection of evidence based on insect clues in criminal investigations

Entomological evidence collection is the process of collecting evidence based on insect clues used in criminal investigations. If evidence is not carefully preserved at a crime scene after a death, it may be difficult or impossible for an entomologist to make an accurate identification of specimens, if for example, all morphological characteristics are not preserved.

== Collecting materials ==
One of the most valuable things a forensic entomologist has is his collection kit. There are commercially available insect evidence collection kits , but one can customize their own to meet geographical and budget requirements. Below is a list of necessary tools.

- Aerial or sweep insect nets: Nets can be anywhere from 15-36"
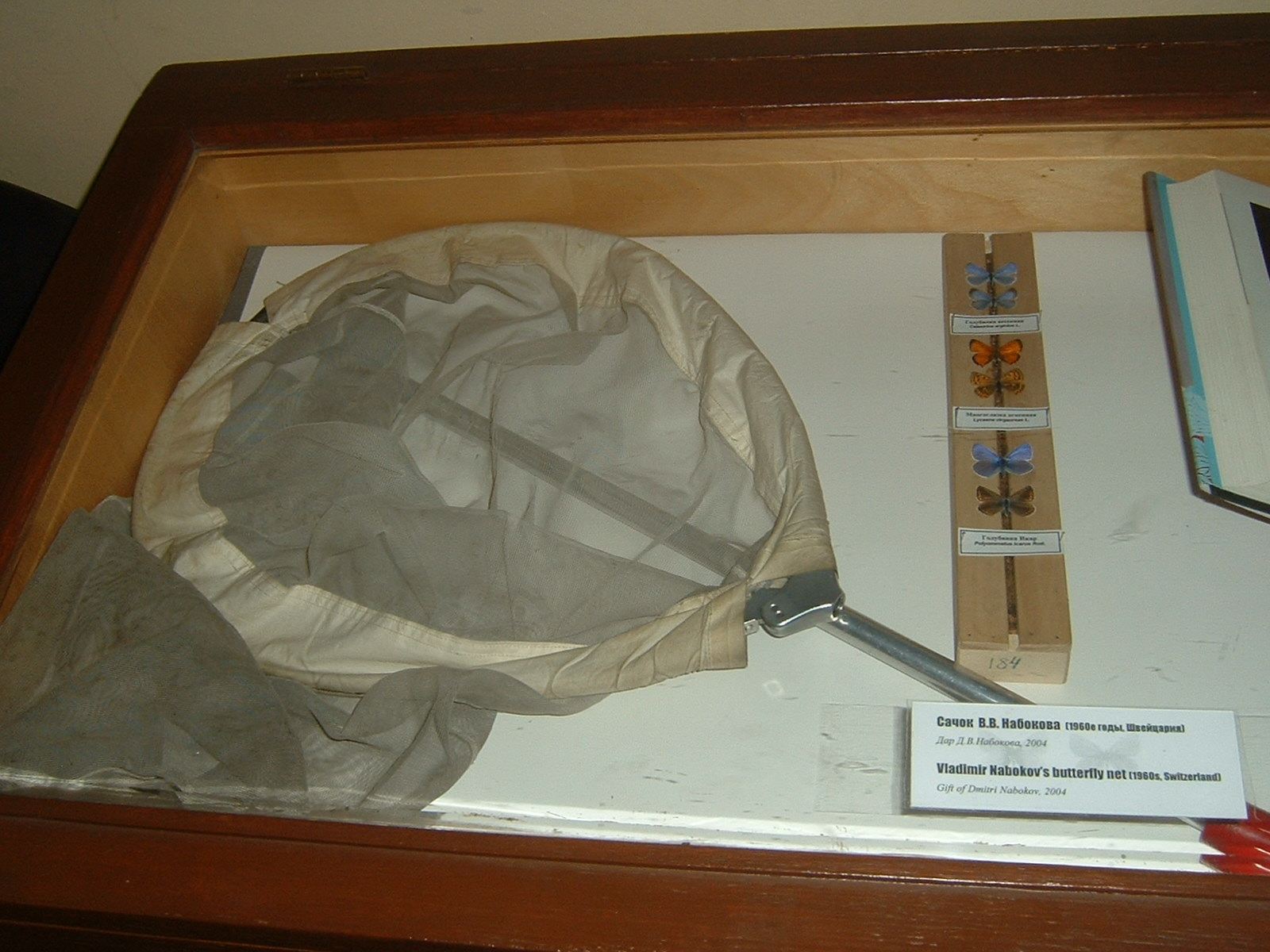
  Aerial or sweep insect net
- Sticky Traps: (see Fig. 1)
- Feather weight or light touch forceps
- Collection Vials: Screw cap type with neoprene cap inserts 4-dram size, killing jars which are jars of ½" of plaster to absorb the ethyl acetate
- Plastic "yogurt" or "bait" containers: Used in collecting and shipping larvae
- Aluminum foil: Used in constructing a pouch that will hold the live larvae and their food source during shipment
- Vermiculite: Used in filling the bottom of the larval containers

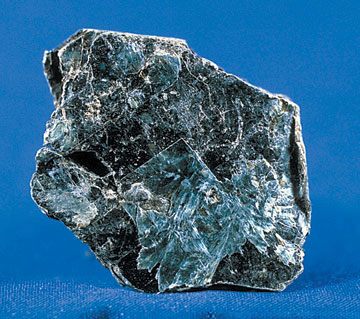
Vermiculite

- Plastic specimen containers 4-8oz size
- Non-adhesive and heavy bond paper paper labels used in labeling and placement inside and outside of the collection containers
- #2 pencil
- Small hand trowel or garden spade: Used in soil sampling and digging for migrating larvae or pupae in outdoor death scenes
- Thermometers: Preferably digital, but dial type, mercury, or alcohol types are fine
- 35 mm SLR camera, lens, and flash: Used for on the scene macrophotography of insects. Also, a standard 35 mm lens should be used for general scene photographs.
- Ruler or any other measuring device: For showing scale in photographs
- Disposable gloves

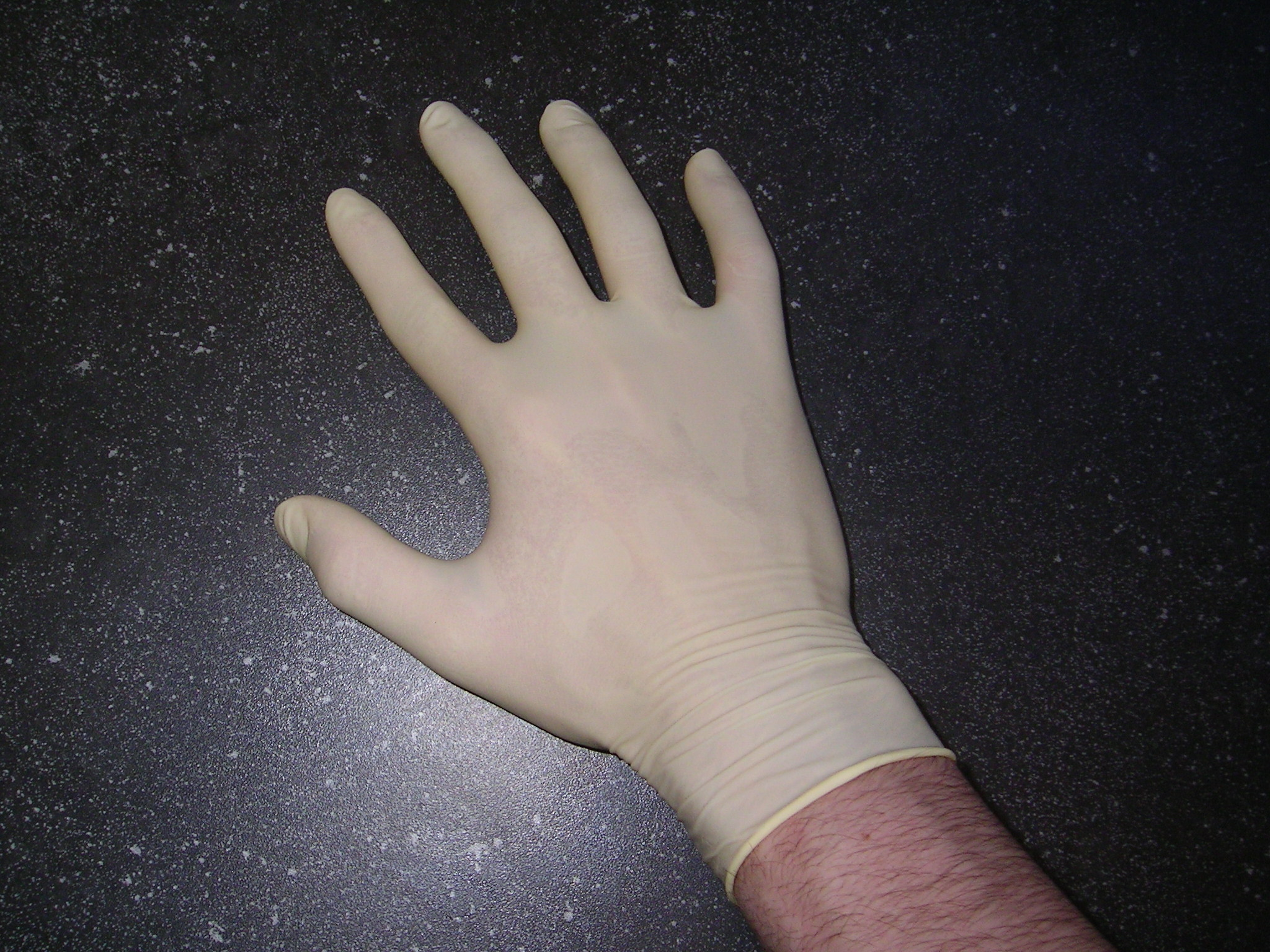
Disposable gloves

- Preservation and collection chemicals: In particular ethyl alcohol, ethyl acetate, and KAA
- Paper towels: For use in kill jars and for cleaning utensils
- Thermos of boiling water: Used to boil the larvae
- Sifting screens: Used for processing soil samples for insects and insect artifacts
- Entomological Death Scene Form
- Shipping containers: Styrofoam containers with lids are best as it offers good insulation from temperature extremes, but corrugated cardboard boxes are widely used

- This list was adapted from Dr. J.H. Byrd’s website for entomological collection equipment and materials.

== Collecting specimens ==
In order for entomological evidence to be of value for a death scene investigation it is important that every detail be noted and preserved. Great care must be exercised when collecting insects to ensure that morphological characteristics are kept intact for positive species identification. It is also important to make detailed observations of the body's surroundings so that inferences to the events preceding death can be made by linking the stages of insects found to their access to the body. This is accomplished by using the proper tools and paper work to collect and record all available evidence. In most cases, it is important to collect samples for the study of insect succession three times a day for about a month. Environmental and body temperatures also have to be taken into account when determining the post mortem interval.

=== Collecting insects on the body ===
Great care should be used when removing insects from the body prior to it being removed from the scene. During this collection the body, clothing, and immediate surroundings must not be disturbed. Insects may only be removed from the surface of the body, and great care must be taken with forceps and other tool to prevent postmortem artifacts. Any damage to the body or integrity of the scene can create misleading evidence that could be detrimental to the investigation. Also, the location on the body were each sample of specimens was collected should be clearly noted on the specimens label.

==== Collecting eggs ====
Eggs are extremely small and delicate, so great care should be taken in their collection. Eggs are generally laid in clumps or masses, and are found in any orifice whether it be a natural opening or a wound. The safest way to remove eggs is by using a small paint brush dipped in water, so that the eggs stick to the bristles. Forceps may be used but can often damage the eggs. Half of the eggs should be placed into a preservative, while the other half should be kept alive to be reared out. Since it is often difficult to identify insect eggs rearing the eggs to adulthood provides positive identification. In order to prevent the eggs from dehydrating it is important to place a damp tissue or other media in the collection vial. It also important to make sure the eggs have air, placing a paper towel over the top using a rubber band provides plenty of ventilation. Newly emerged maggots are very small so the vial must remain upright to prevent escape.

==== Collecting maggots and larva ====
It is important to collect all the various sizes of maggots found at each maggot mass. Larger maggots usually represent the first flies to arrive on the body, but different sized maggots can also represent different species. The maggot mass location and temperature will influence the degree days it takes for the fly to develop. It is important to preserve the specimen to see their exact state of development for evidences later on. This can be done by boiling the maggots, and then placing them in a 70% alcohol or 50% isopropyl alcohol. A sample of living specimens approximately 100 of each size or distinguishable species, should be kept in a maggot rearing container. It is important to keep the species and sizes separate to prevent cannibalism. Since 1st and 2nd instars can be delicate it may be necessary to remove them with a brush in the same manner discussed with the eggs. The more robust 3rd instar maggots may be removed with forceps (Anderson). Another technique that may be used for removing maggots is to scoop them up with plastic spoon.

==== Pupa ====
Pupa can occasionally be found on the clothing of the body, and may be removed using forceps or fingers. Since pupa will not grow, it is not necessary to preserve them. If a specimen is found with a pale color, it has just entered pupation. Such a specimen should be kept separate because its exact age can be determined accurately, to within a few hours. All insects found on the body should be placed into kill jars and properly labeled. For the most part adult flies are only important for indicating what species of fly may develop on the corpse. However, if an adult with crumpled wings is found it should be labeled as such, because this indicates that it may have just emerged from its pupil casing. This indicates that at least one generation of flies has developed off the corpse. In addition, sticky traps can be used (by placing them around the body) to collect the insects moving around the body (mainly flies).

The entire sticky trap is usually observed under a microscope to identify the species of the insects on the trap, because it is very difficult to separate them from the trap. Many other insects besides flies are attracted to the scene because of the odor, while others are incidentally present. Therefore, insects are collected selectively. One other insect that is forensically important is the beetle, known to provide clues to the degree of exposure the body has experienced. Gloves are recommended for capturing adult beetle and larvae, as this makes it easier to transfer both the adult and the larvae beetle into a proper collection container by hand without the worry of crushing their sclerotized exoskeleton.

== Techniques for collecting specimens before body removal ==
=== Pup tent fly traps ===
Fig. 1

This technique was developed in Knoxville, Tennessee in 1989, and in the pilot study was found to be more effective than using an aerial net. The traps are constructed using manufactured sticky traps measuring approximately 9 inches (230 mm) by 10 inches (250 mm) in the shape of an inverted “V”, or pup tent, with the sticky material on the outside (see fig 1). These traps generally have four clothespins clipped to the bottom corners to provide ground clearance. The traps are placed at varying distances from the body, between 1 foot (0.30 m) and 12 feet (3.7 m), with one side facing the body. The sides of the traps should be set at a 60-degree angle. When collection is done the sticky trap should be labeled with both the time it was put out and the time it was picked up. In the lab insect can be individually removed and rinsed with paint thinner or xylene before preservation.

=== Sweeping ===
Generally insects associated with carrion are strong and fast fliers, but with practice can be caught using an aerial net. The sweeping technique involves making quick back and forth sweeps across the body in succession. Each time direction is changed the mouth of the net must be flipped 180 degrees to maintain one entrance. Speed is important not only for capturing insects, but for keeping those already caught inside. Generally 6-10 sweeps are sufficient, and on the last sweep the opening of the net is lifted so that is horizontal at about chest height, and then flipped 180 degrees to close the net. The tail end of the net can then place into a kill jar with the lid closed. After about 2 to 5 minutes the insects can be preserved. This procedure should be repeated approximately 3 times to ensure a good sample of flying insects in the area. Note that it may be necessary to use a sturdier net in wooded or brushy areas, so that the net won't tear.

=== Labeling ===
As soon as a specimen is collected it should be properly labeled. Labels should include all of the following sample number, exact time, date, case number, and county/city. It is important that a label be placed inside the sample vial and on the outside as well. The label should never be placed on the lid, since lids can be easily switched. It is also imperative to use a graphite pencil, never a pen. Many of the preservatives used can make ink run, and that not only destroys the label but can damage the specimen. For specimens collected from the body, the exact location from which they were removed should be included on the label.

=== Procedure after the removal of the body ===
After the removal of the body from the death scene, there are procedures to be followed in order to obtain an accurate time of death. One of the methods of documentation is the death scene case study form. This form is used to record the condition of the body as well as the surroundings of where the body was found. Before evidence is collected, photographs will be taken in order to document the scene.

=== Under body procedures ===
Immediately after the body is removed from the scene, the soil which was under the body is observed. Examining the soil will produce evidence to help in the investigation. Under the body there can be beetles and maggots burying themselves in the soil. This is why it is important to take soil samples directly under the body so as to recover these insects that might be hidden from plain sight. Insects of all stages of development are collected. These stages can be in the form of eggs, larva (of which the largest instars are the most important for identification) pupa and adults. Half of these insects will be preserved and the other half will be reared to adults for analysis in the lab. Information on other insects found in the area that are known to be predaceous is documented. The predacous insects could be responsible for insects that are usually present on a body. Litter under the body and the litter in close proximity of where the body was discovered will be collected. These litter samples could hold insects too small to collect. In order to separate the insects from the litter a Berlese/Tullgren funnel is used.

=== Temperature, weather, and climate ===
Temperature, weather and climate are important readings to record. These readings will aid in determining degree days. An insect’s development is based on these factors. There are a few different temperature readings that are taken of the area. The first is the air temp at chest height. Secondly, the temperature between the body and the ground is recorded. The next temperature to take is the ground surface immediately under the body, 1-2 M away from the body which includes three different sources. These three sources are under the grass or ground litter, 4 cm soil depth and 20 cm soil depth (http://brazoria_county.com). The maggot mass temperature will be recorded. The weather and climate data is collected from two different sources. The first source will be from the scene of death itself. Maximum and minimum temperatures for three to five days will be recorded. Accuracy in collecting the weather and climate data is important. Conditions such as direct sunlight or dewfall can affect the accuracy of the data taken. The instrument used to record relative humidity is the psychrometer. This data will then be compared to the data collected from the second source which would be the National Weather Service (NWS Station) or an approved agency. The data required from the NWS Station is for the time period of two weeks before the estimated time of death to three to five days after the estimated time of death. The use of the recordings from the forensic entomologist of the death scene temperatures and the NWS station combined will increase the accuracy of the post mortem interval.

=== Analysis of area ===
Use of the death scene case study form assists in documenting the immediate area of where the body was discovered. While analyzing the area the method of concentric circles is utilized in order to ensure evidence is not overlooked. This area can contain the different insects that were once on the body and have left due to the movement of the body. Track marks left in the ground left by large masses of maggots leaving the body in order to pupate can be identified by an entomologist. With the presence of an entomologist at the scene, evidence such as this can be correctly identified instead of investigators inaccurately determining the body was dragged across the ground. The death scene case study form includes recording whether the area is rural, urban, or aquatic. Recording where the body was found is also important, as decomposition happens at different rates depending on where the body was located. A body in the air will decompose faster than a body in the water and the body in the water will decompose faster than one found buried in the ground. This information is compiled in order to determine the postmortem interval.

== Example cases ==
The following cases provide examples of how crime scene investigators and forensic entomologists use insects during their investigation and while solving cases.

=== Cheese skipper larvae on heroin addict ===
In November 1995, a female heroin addict committed suicide by placing her neck across a rail road track of a moving train. Her body was found under shrubbery close to the tracks. The abdominal cavity and chest’s organs were not identifiable. Some decaying tissue was still attached to the pelvis and extremities. A small amount of hair was located close to the skeletal skull. Initially, an estimated post mortem interval was set at two to three months.

During the autopsy, masses of piophilid larvae were identified in the decomposed remains and exposed bones. On the dry skin and hair, yellow eggs were found. Unfortunately, the breeding room was poisoned during the breeding of the insect eggs found on the body. Identification had to be made based on isolated body parts of an adult fly later identified as Piophila casei or more commonly known as the Cheese fly, which usually populate uncovered cadavers three to six months after death. Because of the amount of eggs found on the body, it was believed that a second generation had been produced on the body. Based on the development of these flies, a postmortem interval was calculated and the body was believed to be at the site for 112 to 128 days. It was later discovered that the woman had been reported missing for four months.

Other beetles were found on the body and hair, but were not important in diagnostic value.

=== Adult fly on decomposed head ===
In May 1996, police were notified by a man telling them that his wife had been dead in their flat for twenty-nine days. He told police that he had not previously told of her death in fear of losing the flat. When the corpse was found, both flies and larvae had populated the body and mummification had begun. It was also noted that the body had been covered with blankets, keeping the body temperature warmer than room temperature.

During the postmortem assessment, masses of maggots were found in the vaginal tract, hair, and in the bladder. Unfortunately, many maggots had been removed prior to informing the entomologist. Although the head was moderately mummified, the skin on the face, soft tissue of the eyes, lower jaw, ears, and tongue was absent. The mouth remained completely open and the skull was whole. However, after removing the skull cap, an adult Protophormia terraenovae and its larvae were found within the skull, but the brain was missing. Protophomia terraenovae are the most frequent species associated with people in the area of the scene and are known to have a life cycle within nineteen to twenty-three days.

Several odd observation were found in this case. First, Protophormia terraenovae usually pupate on the exterior of the body, except when it is either wet or in bright light. The fly is thought to have been inadvertently trapped; nevertheless, the breeding conditions were very atypical. Secondly, Protophormia terraenovae adults are typically originate on bodies that have been dead for more than one month.

=== Corpse of drug user with postmortem lividities at two different points ===
In August 1996, a known drug user was discovered dead within a wooded area. Toxicology tests showed that death took place around three hours after heroin had been ingested. Police had also been reported that the body was not seen nine hours prior to them arriving. The dressed body was left uncovered in an open area of grass.

Masses of eggs were found on the eyelids of the corpse. Once the eggs were bred, it was determined that the species was the Blow-fly Lucilia ampullacea, a Lucilia species uncommonly located with living people in the area. Other species of insects were also found on the body, but did not have entomological importance.

The case holds several interesting facts that must be taken into account when investigating the case. First, had the eggs, maggots and insects taken from the scene not dried out in a bag then thrown away, it could have been possible to determine if the body was placed at the scene late at night or early that morning. Also, at this moment, the effect of drugs in a body to the insects consuming it, is still in progress. This case helps in the study by illustrating that Lucilia ampullacea was not deterred by the heroin within the body. Lastly, as seen in photographs taken at the scene, flies were seen to be in beginning development stages, signifying that the person died inside then taken outside. This is not abnormal that a heroin addict dies and is ignored within friends, as he is believed to be sleeping or on a bad drug trip. It is not uncommon that when the person is known to be dead, friends with him will leave the body outside to avoid any questioning and investigation. The entomological evidence and the fact that the body was unseen in an open field for a long time period supports the idea that the body initially dead inside and taken outside.

== Current research ==
Currently, research is being done to determine when a body was placed outside, either day or night. For example, by comparing developmental stages of Lucilia and Calliphora, the time of day should be able to be distinguished. Calliphora is thought to not oviposit at night while Lucilia does, so when evaluating the late stages of Lucilia and the beginning stages of Calliphora, time can be theorized. Another area of research, entomotoxicology Entomotoxicology, is understanding what drugs, either street or prescribed, does to insects when consuming a corpse that has ingested the drug. Also, whether the drug deters some insects or attracts them to the body.

An advancement that has recently been made is due to the development of techniques such as the polymerase chain reaction, PCR, to identify remains. Researchers have been able to isolate the gut content of insects found on bodies and use techniques similar to PCR to recover mitochondrial DNA. This mitochondrial DNA has been used to identify the species of the insect as well as the human remains. Advancements in technology such as this will help solve cases, especially during the late decomposition stage.
