= Ear print analysis =

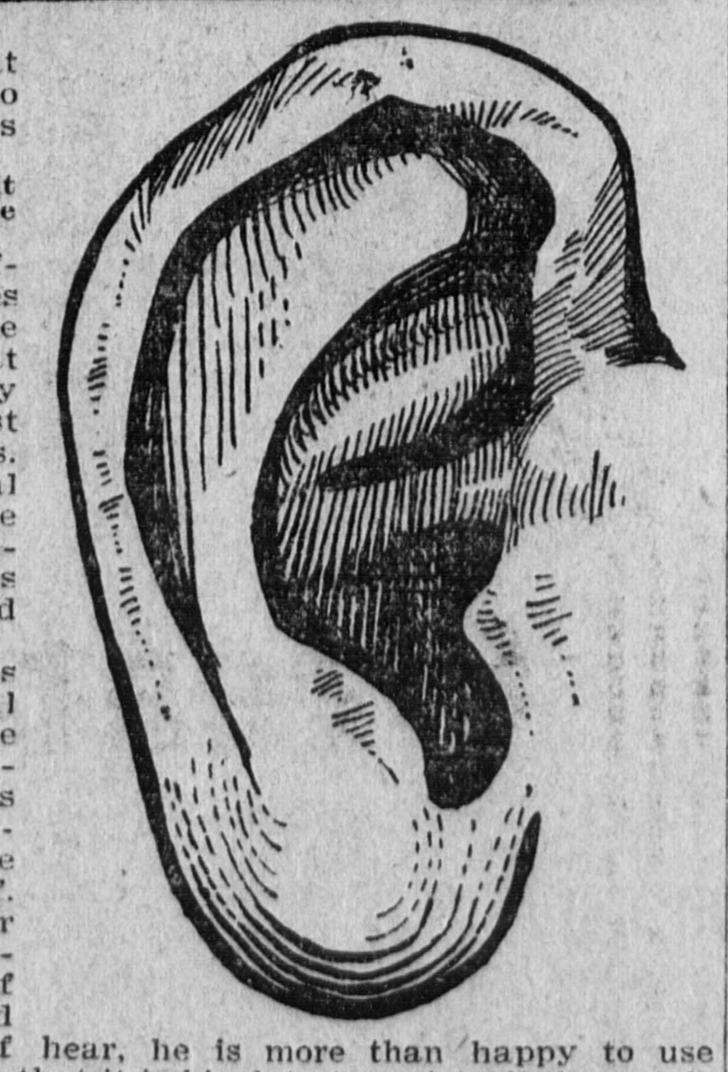
Human ear (sketch)

Ear print analysis is used as a means of forensic identification intended as an identification tool similar to fingerprinting. An ear print is a two-dimensional reproduction of the parts of the outer ear that have touched a specific surface (most commonly the helix, antihelix, tragus and antitragus). Ear prints and their use for identification were first discovered by Fritz Hirschi in 1965. Fritz Hirschi was the first to identify a criminal using this method, in Switzerland in 1965 and ear print analysis has also been successfully used to solve crimes in the UK and the Netherlands. In addition to identification, the height of an ear imprint at a crime scene may also provide investigators with information regarding the stature of the perpetrator.

In 2002–2005 the Forensic Ear Identification (FearID) research project commenced to analyse the use of ear print evidence in criminal investigations. The research project was sponsored by the European Union to study the effectiveness of ear prints to be used as evidence in criminal investigations. The project used ear prints from 1229 donors. The European Commission is currently trying to create a database that will set the worldwide standard for ear print analysis.

The reasoning behind the limited use of ear print analysis in modern-day forensics is due to the complex nature of collection and analysis methods. There has been some success with ear print analysis but the collection methods of ear prints and the complexity of proving a print matches a specific ear makes the identification method unreliable.

== History ==
Fritz Hirschi, from Bern, Switzerland, was one of the first people to use ear prints for identification, in 1965. Hirschi analysed two earmarks at the scene of a burglary in Bienne, Switzerland. The earmarks were then used to observe if there was a connection between a more recent burglary where two men were arrested. The two men had their ear prints taken to compare to the previous marks left at the first burglary. Hirschi discovered that one of the two suspects had an ear print significantly similar to the ear mark at the first burglary, convincing Hirschi that he was involved with the most recent burglary.

=== Use as evidence ===
The creation of the ear print identification system (similar to the fingerprint identification system) was developed by a University of Leicester Professor Guy Rutty along with a private forensics company. The team presented its work at the American Academy of Forensic Sciences in Dallas. Rutty measured the ear and observed physical elements such as sex differences in the external auditory canal, where females have shorter canals than males. The discoveries by Professor Guy Rutty of physical variations in the human ear opened the field of identification methods using ear prints.

Ear prints have been used in criminal cases for identification in Holland, with more than 200 judicial cases. Ear print databases are common in Spain, with history of criminal sentences using ear prints as evidence.

== FearID project ==
The Forensic Ear Identification (FearID) research project commenced in 2002 to analyse the use of ear print evidence in criminal investigations. The project was sponsored by the European Union and was composed of nine institutes from the United Kingdom, Italy and Netherlands.

=== Methods of collection ===
The project used 1229 donors who donated three left and right ear prints. The ear prints were collected using controlled methods. Donors pressed their ear up to a glass plate and were instructed to listen for a sound. Then the ear print was lifted with a black gel filter. The research project aimed to standardise a method of ear print collection and accurately depict the print an ear may leave at a crime scene. Analysis of the ear print included details such as shape, size, Darwinian tubercles, creases, moles, piercings and scars.

=== Limitations discovered in project ===
The methodology used in the FearID project where donors press their ear against a glass plate to depict the print at the scene is not valid to use for forensic investigations today. This is due to the inability to control the force suspects place on the glass. Suspects may not cooperate, and prints may not be representative of reality.

== Limitations of ear print analysis ==
Ear print analysis is not used as a valid and reliable method for identification due to its lack of scientific research. Present day forensic analysis commonly uses DNA testing methods as it is more reliable and valid in court.

=== Factors affecting analysis ===
Ear print analysis can be greatly affected by certain factors:

- How long the suspect's ear was in contact with the surface, and the applied force
- Smudging or sliding occurring on surface
- The quality of surface (glass and metal have greater potential for detailed prints)
- Secretion of oils or waxes on the ear
- Environment factors (weather, period of time since the print was left to when it is lifted)
- The method of ear print lifting (using different materials instead of FearID black gel lifters)
- Storage of information (software used and the loss of details when prints are transferred to a digital form

These factors outline the difficulties in creating specific methods to extract and analyse ear prints. Each factor affects the reliability and validity of the print. Additionally, a variety of ear prints can be made by the same ear due to these factors and the uniqueness of an ear print.

== Use in court ==
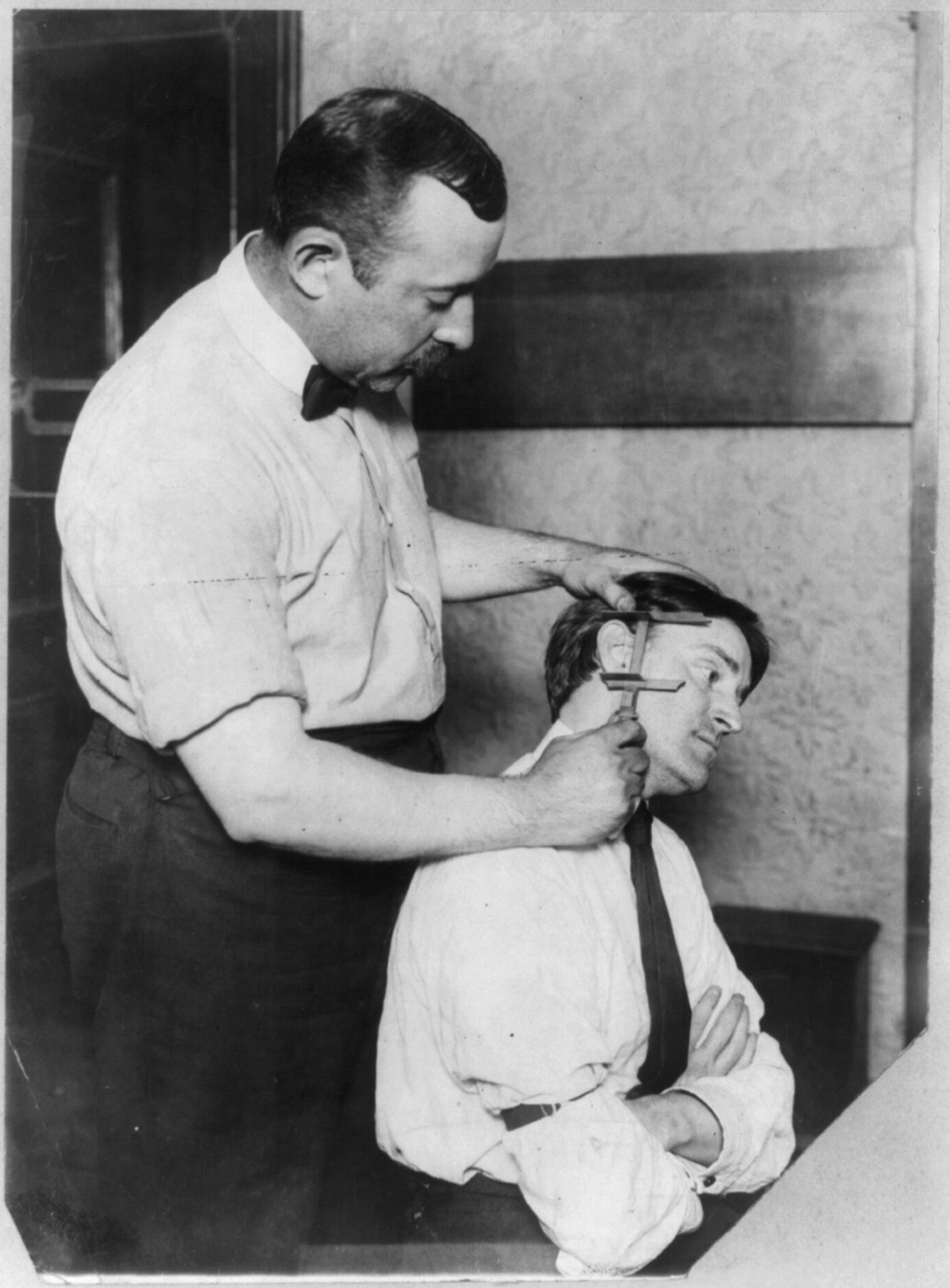
New York City Police Dept. activities- taking Bertillon measurements-ear LCCN2006677371

There is a lack of jurisprudence, doctrinal studies and studies relating to comparative law on the significance of ear prints in forensic investigations. Ear prints are not accepted as reliable evidence in court cases. In court cases, definitions used to define the evidence of ear prints are not completely assertive. Wording such as "there is 'high probability' the ear print was made by the suspect" is used.

=== Subjectivity ===
The identification of an ear print matching a suspect's ear mark is based on the assessment by a forensic specialist. The match of an ear print to an ear mark and its value in court is based on the forensic examiners judgement. The use of ear prints in court is not common due to factors such as the subjectivity of value given to a print and the forensic examiner's experience.

=== Notable cases ===
Notable cases of ear print identification failing to convict suspects of crime include Mark Dallagher's United Kingdom case from 1998. Dallagher was convicted of murder on the foundation of an ear print. In January 2004, the conviction was dropped due to DNA testing that found his DNA was not a match with the earmark found at the scene.

== Future possibilities ==
Ear print analysis needs further research and scientific method improvement to ensure analysis is reliable and valid. Due to improvements in technology, the future of ear print analysis to be used widely in criminal investigations is possible.

There are still fundamental questions to consider when analysing ear prints. There needs to be a greater understanding of ear print features and factors and how they can improve intraindividual variation. Ear prints need to resemble the same ear more than it resembles another ear. Subjectivity also has to be accepted when scientific experts analyse ear prints and make conclusions.
