= SelectaDNA =

Security device that marks perpetrators or property with a traceable DNA stain

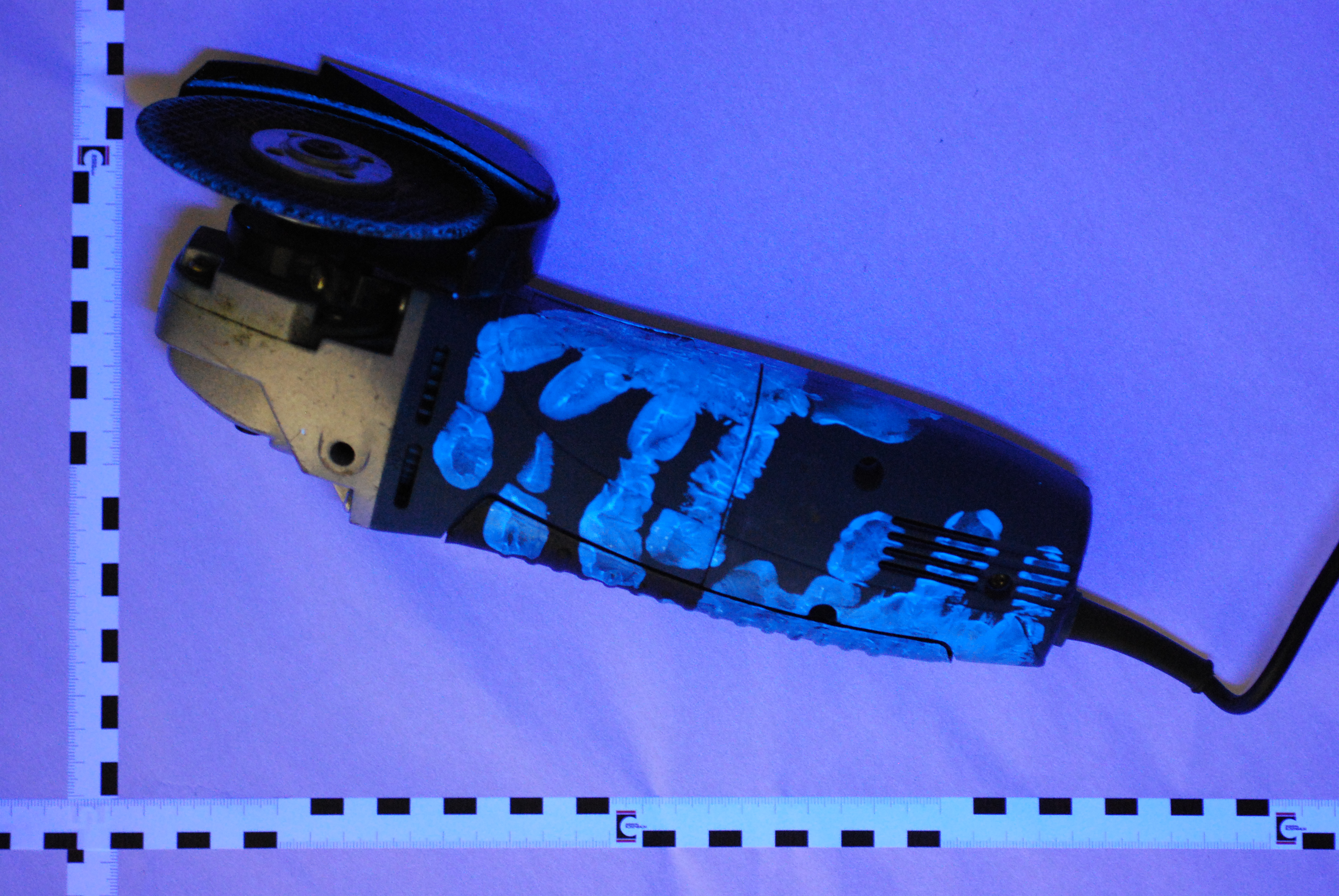
DNA marked grinder

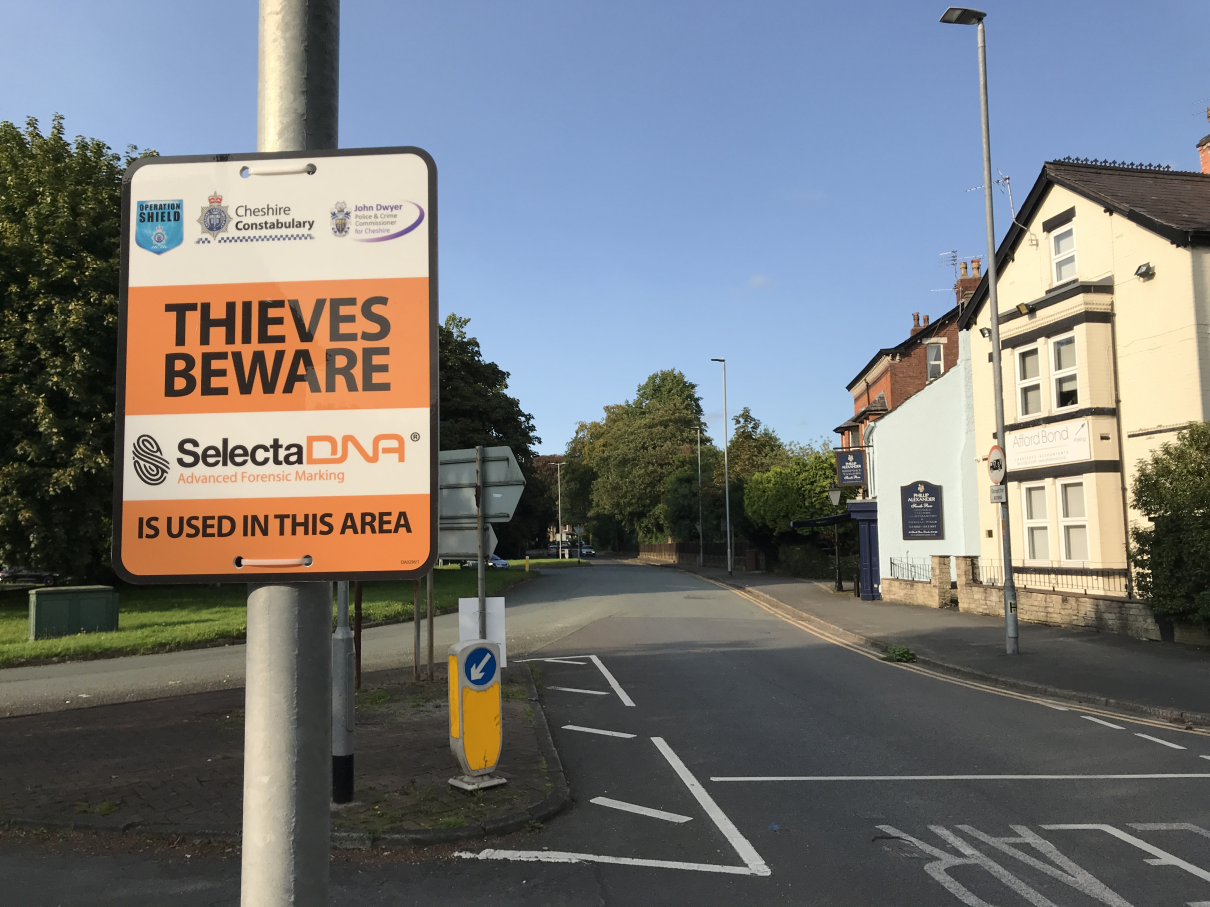
SelectaDNA protection warning sign in Wilmslow, Cheshire, UK

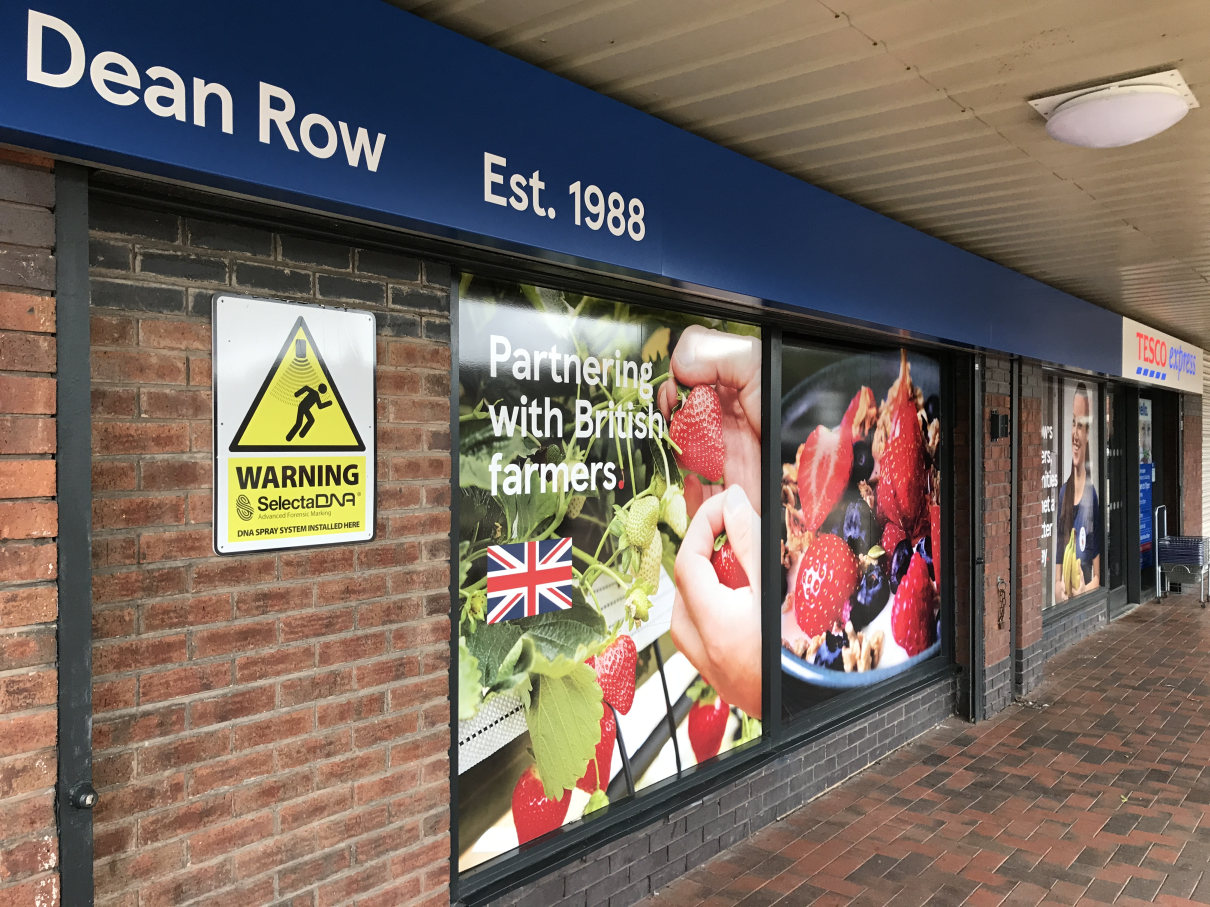
SelectaDNA spray warning sign on a Tesco Express shop in Wilmslow, Cheshire, UK

SelectaDNA is a forensic property marking system used as part of crime prevention strategies for businesses and residential properties.

== Mechanism ==
The SelectaDNA is a range of property and offender marking products combining synthetic DNA coding with microdot technology. Each SelectaDNA kit has sufficient fluid to mark up to 50-60 items or parts of an item such as a car. Both the fluid and the microdots carry a unique code which the owner has to register in a database to which the police has access. In case of theft and the police recovering the item, it can be traced back to its owner. A code found on an asset or person can be deciphered by a molecular genetic laboratory and identified back to a specific owner or location. The fluid is almost invisible, does no damage to the property and only becomes visible in ultraviolet light. Also, dogs can be trained to sniff SelectaDNA marked items, as demonstrated by an initiative run by Wiltshire Police in cooperation with Search Dogs UK in July 2022.

Every marking kit and spray canister has a unique forensic DNA signature which is a series of combinations of A (Adenine), C (Cytosine), G (Guanine) and T (Thymine). The synthetic DNA used is short-chain, making it as robust as human DNA.

== Kit contents ==
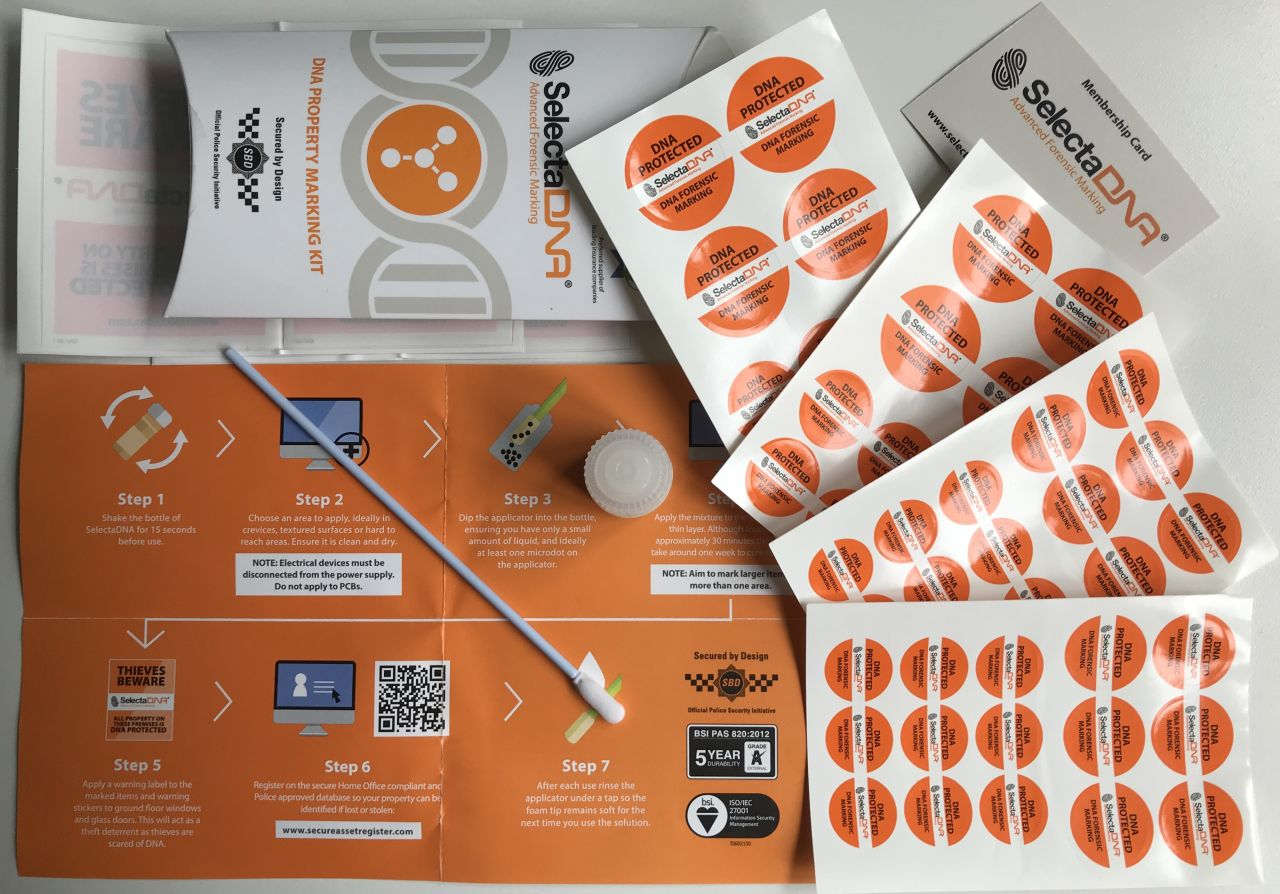
SelectaDNA property marking kit contents

The property marking kit includes a bottle of the marking fluid, application swap, 50 ID stickers, four 'thieves beware' stickers, a set-up membership card and instructions. The 50 warning labels are to be attached to the marked items or properties to act as a deterrent for potential thieves or burglars. Some UK police departments distribute the kits for free (e.g. the Cheshire Constabulary invested £170,000 to make the kits available to residents), while others offer a discount.

== Possible uses ==
SelectaDNA is used to ‘tag’ valuable property, infrastructure, and criminals, and is available in a number of formats including vehicle marking solutions, Defiance Sprays to deter anti-social behavior and moped-enabled crime, SelectaDNA Trace for metal protection and Intruder Sprays for robbery prevention and transport protection. Formats for covert operations include transferable Gels, Grease and, Trespass Beads. SelectaDNA not only reduces crime but also enables police to link criminals to crime scenes and secure convictions. The Intruder Spray version can be used in instances where the perpetrator cannot be immediately caught or followed, e.g. sprayed by retail staff onto an intruder or sprayed onto a leaving thief from a can located above the shop door.

Valuable items such as old cars, personal possessions such as laptops or mobile phones, farm equipment, contractor tools, bikes, can be marked with the solution. In the event that any items are stolen and recovered by police, they are immediately traceable back to the owner. PCSP Chairman Alderman Robert Smith said: "Armagh, Banbridge and Craigavon PCSP is happy to be part of this pilot project and to be able to provide some support to local farmers protect their property using SelectaDNA."

== Notable users ==
Notable users of the system include the National Health Service, the Royal Bank of Scotland, McDonald's, Post Office Limited, London School of Economics, Tesco, National Trust, Network Rail, Lloyds Bank, Pandora, Chanel, G4S, Securitas, Louis Vuitton, Texaco, Shell plc, Bank of New Zealand, Los Angeles County Metropolitan Transportation Authority, Three UK, and many more.

Over 90% of UK police forces have used SelectaDNA in crime prevention schemes.

In September 2022, Selectamark partnered with the UK National Business Crime Centre, seven police forces (Sussex Police, The Metropolitan Police, Hampshire Constabulary, Essex Police, West Midlands Police, Avon and Somerset Constabulary, and Greater Manchester Police) and Williams Trade Plumbing Supplies in a pilot programme to combat tool theft from commercial vehicles with the use of SelectaDNA property marking kits. It is estimated that £83 million worth of tools have been stolen across England and Wales in 2020-23. The pilot will be followed up with a questionnaire to the owners of marked property to see if their tools have been stolen and if so, whether they have been recovered.

== Effectiveness ==
'Operation Meteor', a scheme conducted by The Policing Institute for the Eastern Region (PIER) at Anglia Ruskin University (ARU) in collaboration with Essex Police, evaluating the effectiveness of property marking to reduce dwelling burglary, found no statistically significant results for all three deterrents (SelectaDNA, SmartWater and Immobilise) due to overall small number of burglaries between November 2019 and November 2020. Moreover, 68% of the participants took additional security measures such as installing locks, timer lights or locking windows when leaving the house or shutting the blinds which may have prevented burglaries. Despite no reduction in crime numbers, the deterrent stickers (applied to 48% of properties where the products were distributed) may had worked as intended, deterring burglars from attacking properties marked with them and choosing other properties instead.

A 2018-2019 study based in an English town (West Bromwich near Birmingham) and three control areas evaluated the reduction in burglary numbers where the product was used was up to 83% in the 6 months following the marking kits distribution. The reduction was however short-lived: in the following 6-month period, burglary levels returned to the pre-treatment level (rose by 84%), despite the warning signs in the area being still in place. Additionally, in the West Bromwich study, as a side effect of property protection, there was a 48% decrease in vehicle crimes and 46% reduction in criminal damage, which were sustained in the second 6-month post-intervention period, unlike the burglary levels that returned to the pre-intervention levels. Violent crime levels decreased slightly (by 22%). Those effects were achieved with 31% saturation rate (only 31% of the targeted residents accepted the marking kits and displayed the warning signs). The study concludes that warning sign display (street signs and window stickers) and kit distribution should be followed by police checks to ensure the items have been marked properly by the residents. Kit distribution and sign display also need to be done in parallel with other programmes, namely "increased resident vigilance, arrest and removal of offenders, difficulty in disposing of marked stolen property, and prosecution of the traders selling stolen goods." Between April 2017 and April 2018, detection levels in England and Wales were 5.5% for burglary and 7% for robbery. The West Bromwich study suggests that the details of prosecutions of offenders and sellers of stolen goods should be promoted to act as another deterrent.

Similar numbers have been quoted in other case studies regarding vehicle theft (38%, 52%, up to 100% reduction).

In February 2022, SelectaDNA kits were distributed to more than 60 farms in South Lanarkshire in Scotland which were previously victims of machinery theft. The kits were funded by rural insurer NFU Mutual as part of its support for the Scottish Partnership Against Rural Crime (SPARC). Up until January 2023, no new thefts were reported since the distribution of the kits. The National Farmers Union Mutual Insurance Society has provided additional funds to assist rolling out the initiative in other parts of Scotland.

== Convictions ==
- In 2018, a scooter thief in West Yorkshire (UK) was jailed for 33 months after both his body and the scooter being marked with a DNA spray. He became the first person in West Yorkshire to be sprayed with the DNA spray.
- In 2018, two teenagers who stole a scooter and failed to stop for Metropolitan Police officers in London, UK, have been arrested after they were found to have traces of DNA tagging spray on them, linking them to the stolen bike and the other offences (excessive speed, driving without insurance).
- The application of the same spray technology has resulted in apprehensions and legal convictions when used by various police departments throughout the United Kingdom, such as West Midlands Police, Cheshire Constabulary, Surrey Police, Merseyside Police, Greater Manchester Police and Police Scotland.
- In 2021, in Albany (USA), an alleged thief was sprayed with SelectaDNA mist in a jewelry store, after reaching over the counter and taking about $4,000 in jewelry. At the time of publication, his criminal case was pending.

== Awards ==
Selectamark Security Systems Plc won the Product Innovation Award at the UK Rail Industry Awards 2016 for the SelectaDNA product which has helped reduce metal theft on Network Rail lines.

On 18 April 2023, Selectamark Security Systems Plc won the Security Innovation/Product of the Year Award from The Security Institute, the UK's largest professional membership body for security professionals, for their Personal Defence Spray.

SelectaDNA won the Norwegian OSPA (Outstanding Security Performance Award) for Best New Security Product (Norway) in 2023.

In 2023, Selectamark Security Systems won the SME of the Year award at British Security Awards presented by the British Security Industry Association.

== Company ==
The system's supplier, Selectamark Security Systems Plc, is part of Secured by Design (SBD), the official UK Police security initiative that "works to improve the security of buildings and their immediate surroundings to provide safe places to live, work, shop and visit" and one of the two forensic deterrent suppliers approved by the Police under the Home Office Secured by Design Scheme (the other being SmartWater).

Selectamark also owns bikeregister.com, the largest bicycle register in the UK with over 1 million bikes registered, and organises an annual Cycle Crime Conference supported by West Midlands Police and British Transport Police. In July 2023, it hosted its 8th National Cycle Crime Conference. The bike markings can be based on QR-code and printed numbers or the SelectaDNA liquid holding the Secured by Design accreditation.

Until 2023, Selectamark has marked more than 100 million valuable items worldwide.

== See also ==
- Alphadot
- Smart Water
