= Frost (disambiguation) =

Frost is a solid deposition of ice on surfaces and objects.

Frost often refers to:

- Frost (temperature), a value of air temperature less or equal than the freezing point of water (0 °C, 32 °F)

Frost may also refer to:

== People ==
- Frost (surname)
- David Frost (1939–2013), British broadcaster and presenter
- Nick Frost, English comedian and actor
- Robert Frost, an American poet

== Places ==
=== United States ===
- Frost, Louisiana, an unincorporated community
- Frost, Minnesota, a town
- Frost, Ohio, an unincorporated community
- Frost, Texas, a city
- Frost, West Virginia, an unincorporated community
- Frost Township, Michigan, United States

=== Elsewhere ===
- Frost (crater), a lunar crater

== Entertainment ==
=== Music ===
==== Performers ====
- Frost (Australian band), a pop rock band
- Frost (British band), an English neo-progressive rock supergroup
- Frost (Norwegian band), an electronica band
- Frost (musician) (Kjetil-Vidar Haraldstad, born 1973), Norwegian drummer for Satyricon
- Frost (rapper), American rapper
- The Frost, a late-1960s American psychedelic rock band

==== Albums ====
- Frost (album), an album by Enslaved
- Frost, an album by Monofader

=== Other media ===
- Frost (collection), stories by Donald Wandrei featuring detective I.V. Frost
- Frost (comics), a character from the Noble Causes series published by Image Comics
- Frost (Mortal Kombat), a character in the Mortal Kombat fighting game series
- Frost (Devil May Cry), a class of demons in the video game Devil May Cry
- Frost, a 6th Universe counterpart of Frieza in the Dragon Ball Super manga and anime
- Mary Elizabeth Bartowski, code named "Frost" in the U.S. TV series Chuck
- Emma Frost or simply Frost, a character from Marvel Comics
- Frost (Bernhard novel), a novel by Thomas Bernhard
- Frost (Bailey novel), a novel by Robin Wayne Bailey
- Frost (2017 film), a Lithuanian film
- Frost (2012 film), a Canadian short drama film
- Killer Frost, the name of 2 fictional villains in DC Comics
- Tina "Frost" Lin Tsang, a playable Operator in Tom Clancy's Rainbow Six Siege
- Frost, a playable character in Warframe

== Other uses ==
- Frost House (disambiguation), any of several places
- Frost Art Museum at Florida International University
- Frost flower, thin layers of ice are extruded from long-stemmed plants
- Frost flower (sea ice), ice crystals
- Frost heaving, the process by which the freezing of water-saturated soil causes the deformation and upward thrust of the ground surface
- Frost National Bank, a bank based in San Antonio, Texas, USA
- Frostenden, Suffolk, England
- Minnesota Frost, a women's hockey team

== See also ==
- Frosting (disambiguation)
- Frosty (disambiguation)
- Jack Frost (disambiguation)
