= Frosti =

Frosti may refer to:

- Frost, a mythical Finnish leader - see Fornjót
- Frosti Jonsson (born 1972), Icelandic musician known as Bistro Boy
- Frosti Sigurjónsson (born 1962), Icelandic politician
- "Frosti", a track on the 2001 Björk album Vespertine
- a prostitute

== See also ==
- Frosty (disambiguation)
