= Sleeping Dogs (video game) =

2012 video game

- Developer: United Front Games
- Publisher: Square Enix
- Producers: Jeff O'Connell; Feargus Carroll
- Designer: Mike Skupa
- Programmer: Dave Roberts
- Artists: Hani Abu-Ghazaleh; Joshua Lee
- Writers: Jacob Krarup; Tim Carter
- Composer: Jeff Tymoschuk
- Platforms: PlayStation 3; Windows; Xbox 360; PlayStation 4; Xbox One; macOS
- Release: August 14, 2012: PS3, Windows, Xbox 360; NA: August 14, 2012; AU: August 16, 2012; EU: August 17, 2012; Definitive Edition; PS4, Windows, Xbox One; AU: October 9, 2014; EU: October 10, 2014; NA: October 14, 2014 macOS; WW: March 31, 2016
- Genre: Action-adventure
- Mode: Single-player

Sleeping Dogs is a 2012 action-adventure game developed by United Front Games and published by Square Enix. The game was released for PlayStation 3, Windows, and Xbox 360 in August 2012. Set in contemporary Hong Kong, the story follows Wei Shen, a Hong Kong-American police officer and martial artist who goes undercover and infiltrates the Sun On Yee Triad organization. Gameplay focuses on Shen's martial arts moves, fighting, shooting and parkour abilities, and on gadgets that can be used for combat and exploration. Aside from the linear story, player can freely roam the game's open world environment and engage in both legal and criminal activities.

Sleeping Dogs' development began in 2008. The game was announced in 2009 as part of the True Crime series but was canceled by Activision Blizzard in 2011, as a result of the project's delays and budget issues. Six months later, Square Enix purchased the publishing rights and retitled the game Sleeping Dogs. During development, United Front staff visited Hong Kong to conduct field research for the visual environments and sound. Square Enix London Studios worked with United Front for the development.

Sleeping Dogs received positive reviews from critics for its combat, protagonist, voice acting, experience system and depiction of the city, but its camera and some animations were criticized. The game had sold over 1.5 million units by September 2012. Several expansion packs were released as downloadable content in the six months following the game's debut. A remastered version, subtitled Definitive Edition, was released for Windows, PlayStation 4, and Xbox One in October 2014.

== Gameplay ==
Sleeping Dogs is an action-adventure game set in an open world environment and played from a third-person perspective. The player controls Wei Shen, a Hong Kong-American police officer who goes undercover and ventures out on a raid to infiltrate the Sun On Yee Triad organization. The initial missions of the game are a linear tutorial for controlling the character. After these missions, the player is allowed to explore the game's world and take part in side missions and other activities. Shen navigates the world by running, jumping, climbing over obstacles, swimming, and driving cars, boats and motorcycles. The heads-up display (HUD) interface features a mini-map that indicates targets, key locations (safe houses and contact points) and Shen's current position. The mini-map incorporates two meters: one shows Shen's health and the other his face. When the face meter fills, upgrades are unlocked such as health regeneration, improved combat abilities and reduced equipment costs. The HUD also displays the weapon carried and its ammunition count.

The game features the option to choose from Triad, Face and Police XPs. Triad XP is obtained through melee combat and violent actions such as "environmental kills". Triad XP awarded is directly proportional to the complexity of attacking moves, and gaining Triad XP unlocks improvements to Shen's melee combat skills such as increased damage, improved weapon durability, and unblockable attacks. Face XP, obtained in civilian side missions, fills Shen's face meter and unlocks cosmetic items such as clothes and vehicles. By reaching a higher Face level, the player can freely buy clothing and vehicles, and even have chosen vehicles delivered to them by a valet at any time and place. When the face meter is full, Shen gains health regeneration, increased attack damage and other benefits. Police XP is gained by minimizing civilian casualties and property damage in missions and by completing police side missions, and gaining Police XP unlocks improvements to Shen's firearm combat skills and abilities such as disarming opponents, hot-wiring or slim-jimming cars, retrieving weapon stashes from the trunks of police cars, increased weapon damage and ammunition capacity, and reduced police heat levels. The clothes, accessories, and vehicles purchased by Shen affect non-player characters' reactions toward him, and certain outfit combinations also affect statistics such as XP gain, damage inflicted, and police heat. The player may collect jade zodiac statuettes and return them to a dojo to unlock different martial arts combos.

Shen performs an environmental kill against an enemy. The health meter, mini-map and status buffs are shown on the heads-up display.

Unlike most similar open-world games, Sleeping Dogs emphasizes melee combat over gunplay. Sleeping Dogs' melee combat has been compared to that of Batman: Arkham Asylum: it allows the player to fight opponents coming from any direction with attack, grapple and counter moves and can be performed with or without weapons. These three basic commands are chained together with the character's movement to execute attacks. The player's face meter fills up faster when enemies are defeated with different moves in rapid succession or with environmental attacks, which are performed by dragging enemies to certain objects, which Shen uses to eliminate opponents. Melee weapons such as knives, tire irons, and frying pans are available, but they break with extended use. Gun combat in Sleeping Dogs combines a cover system with gun fu elements: if the player vaults from cover in a gunfight or manually disarms a gun-wielding enemy, time briefly slows down, and the effect can be prolonged further by chaining together successive headshots. Firearms are scarce in the game and the player can normally carry only one gun at a time: with the exception of handguns, weapons cannot be stored and must be discarded after running out of ammunition.

The player can perform "action hijacks" while driving vehicles: these cause Shen to leap from his vehicle to steal another in motion. In combat, Shen loses health as he takes damage: this can be mitigated by taking cover where available. If the health bar is depleted, the character will respawn at a hospital or a clinic. Health can also be restored by ordering food or drinks from various stalls and vending machines, which also provides a variety of buffs to Shen, such as health regeneration or improved damage.

If the player directs Shen to commit crimes, police response is indicated by a "heat" meter on the HUD. The meter displays the current wanted level; if it reaches 5, the police will aggressively pursue Shen. The meter recedes when Shen is hidden from the cops' line of sight. Police officers continue to search for Shen even if he leaves the wanted vicinity, and they will resume the chase if he is sighted. If Shen is arrested or killed by officers during missions, the player can restart from the last checkpoint.

Some areas in the world remain inaccessible until milestones in the story are achieved. Although the player must complete missions to unlock content and continue the story, they may wander the game's open world and participate in activities such as visiting a karaoke bar, carjacking, street racing and joining a fight club. There are several potential girlfriends for Shen: successfully dating them awards collectibles and bonus content. The completion of side missions rewards the player with new missions, vehicles, and outfits, among other things. As the game progresses, the player acquires various safe houses to save progress in, and at certain times is required to go there to progress further. Like other houses, the player can survey unlocked areas, change outfits, and a parking garage is accessible in which they can use unlocked vehicles.

The game has no multiplayer component, but online leaderboards are available for players to compare scores. Many activities that are not central to the story grant Stat Awards in three tiers: bronze, silver and gold. These unlock achievements and trophies.

== Synopsis ==
=== Setting and characters ===
Sleeping Dogs is set in a contemporary Hong Kong, which is split into four districts named after regions of the city. The game reveals the story of Wei Shen (Will Yun Lee), a former San Francisco Police Department officer who was transferred to the Hong Kong Police Department and assigned the task to infiltrate and destroy a Triad organization known as the Sun On Yee (based on the Sun Yee On). The main storyline features two sub-plots: Shen's balance between completing his police mission whilst committing crimes to prove himself to the Triads, and missions assigned by a Triad lieutenant, including the assassinations of Triad members loyal to other lieutenants.

Shen's mission is coordinated by Thomas Pendrew (Tom Wilkinson); Raymond Mak (Byron Mann) serves as Shen's handler, and the two regularly meet in secret to discuss Shen's progress, while Jane Teng (Kelly Hu) coordinates the main police strike force that responds to Shen's investigations. Shen infiltrates the Sun On Yee via his childhood friend Jackie Ma (Edison Chen), a low-level Triad member; he quickly gains the trust of Winston Chu (Parry Shen), one of the Triad's bosses, and Conroy Wu (Robin Shou), Winston's right-hand-man. Other prominent characters include David Wai-Lin "Uncle" Po (James Hong), the chairman of the Sun On Yee; Uncle's advisor Pockmark Cheuk (Byron Mann); and other Triad bosses – Sam "Dogeyes" Lin (Ron Yuan), Henry "Big Smile" Lee (Tzi Ma), "Broken Nose" Jiang (Elizabeth Sung), and Howard "Two Chin" Tsao (Conan Lee). Secondary characters include socialite Vivienne Lu (Lucy Liu). Shen's potential love interests include American tourist Amanda Cartwright (Emma Stone), electronics expert "Not Ping" (Celina Jade), and night club hostess Tiffany Kim (Yunjin Kim).

=== Plot ===
Wei Shen, a petty criminal in Aberdeen, Hong Kong, joins an associate named Naz Singh to conduct a drug deal with Four Finger Wu, a member of the 18K. The deal is interrupted by a security guard, who Wu kills in panic, before he and Singh are arrested. In jail, Shen meets his childhood friend Jackie Ma, who offers to introduce Shen to the head of his gang upon release. Unbeknownst to Jackie, Shen is an undercover cop. His arrest was part of an operation by SP Thomas Pendrew and Inspector Raymond Mak to infiltrate Jackie's gang, the Water Street Boys, a branch of the Sun On Yee triad.

Shen joins the Water Street Boys with Jackie's help. Despite initial animosity from enforcer Conroy Wu, Shen quickly earns the trust of the leader Winston Chu, who assigns Shen and Jackie against the Jade Gang, a rival branch of the Sun On Yee led by Sam "Dogeyes" Lin. Shen has history with Dogeyes, as he is the ex-boyfriend of Shen's sister, Mimi, an addict who died of an overdose after their family moved to America. Meanwhile, Shen is tasked by Inspector Jane Teng of the Hong Kong Police Department to arrest a ketamine supplier named Popstar and his associates.

Popstar's arrest creates a bottleneck in ketamine supply, causing tensions among the Sun On Yee. The Water Street Boys begin suspecting that Shen is a cop, but he shifts suspicions to Ming, a ketamine dealer working for Winston. After Dogeyes' men shoot up Winston's mother's restaurant, the Water Street Boys burn down Dogeyes' waterfront sweatshop. Shen captures Siu Wah, manager of Dogeyes' operation, forcing him to work for Winston. Coming to treat Shen as his second-in-command, Winston introduces him to David Wa-Lin "Uncle" Po, the elderly chairman of the Sun On Yee. Privately, Winston tells Shen to take over as the leader of the Water Street Boys should anything happen to him. Mutual retaliatory attacks culminate in Winston and his fiancée, Peggy Li, being killed during a massacre at their wedding by men posing as the 18K. Uncle Po is critically wounded in the attack, but is saved by Shen, who is promoted to "Red Pole" of the Sun On Yee.

Taking over his position in the Water Street branch, Shen tracks down Winston's killer, Johnny Ratface, who reveals that Dogeyes instigated the attack. Shen eventually captures Dogeyes, who is killed by Winston's mother. Once Uncle Po dies in the hospital, Shen becomes embroiled in a power struggle over the leadership of Sun On Yee, siding with "Broken Nose" Jiang against another leader, Henry "Big Smile" Lee. After Uncle Po's funeral, where they are attacked by the 18K, Lee agrees to an election for the new leader of the Sun On Yee, promising retaliation if he does not win. Shen refuses Pendrew's order to leave the case, fearing that Lee may take over.

Lee soon instigates attacks against other branches to eliminate the competition and intimidate votes in his favor. Afterward, Shen rescues Jackie, who was being used as bait. Prior to the election, Shen is lured into finding a disemboweled Jackie hanging in an alleyway. He is then abducted by Liu Shen Tong, a feared Triad enforcer who knows Shen is a cop. After being tortured, Shen escapes and kills Tong. When Shen confronts Lee at his compound, before killing him, he learns that Pendrew betrayed him.

With the civil war over following Lee's death, Jiang is elected chairwoman of the Sun On Yee. While Shen is commended on his work, he is informed by Raymond that Pendrew has been promoted to Interpol. Shen eventually receives video from Jiang revealing Pendrew killed Uncle Po by injecting chemicals into his IV. Leaking the footage, Shen incriminates Pendrew, returning to work on the police force. Jiang watches Shen from afar, ordering the remaining Sun On Yee to leave him alone due to his loyalty to her.

== Development ==
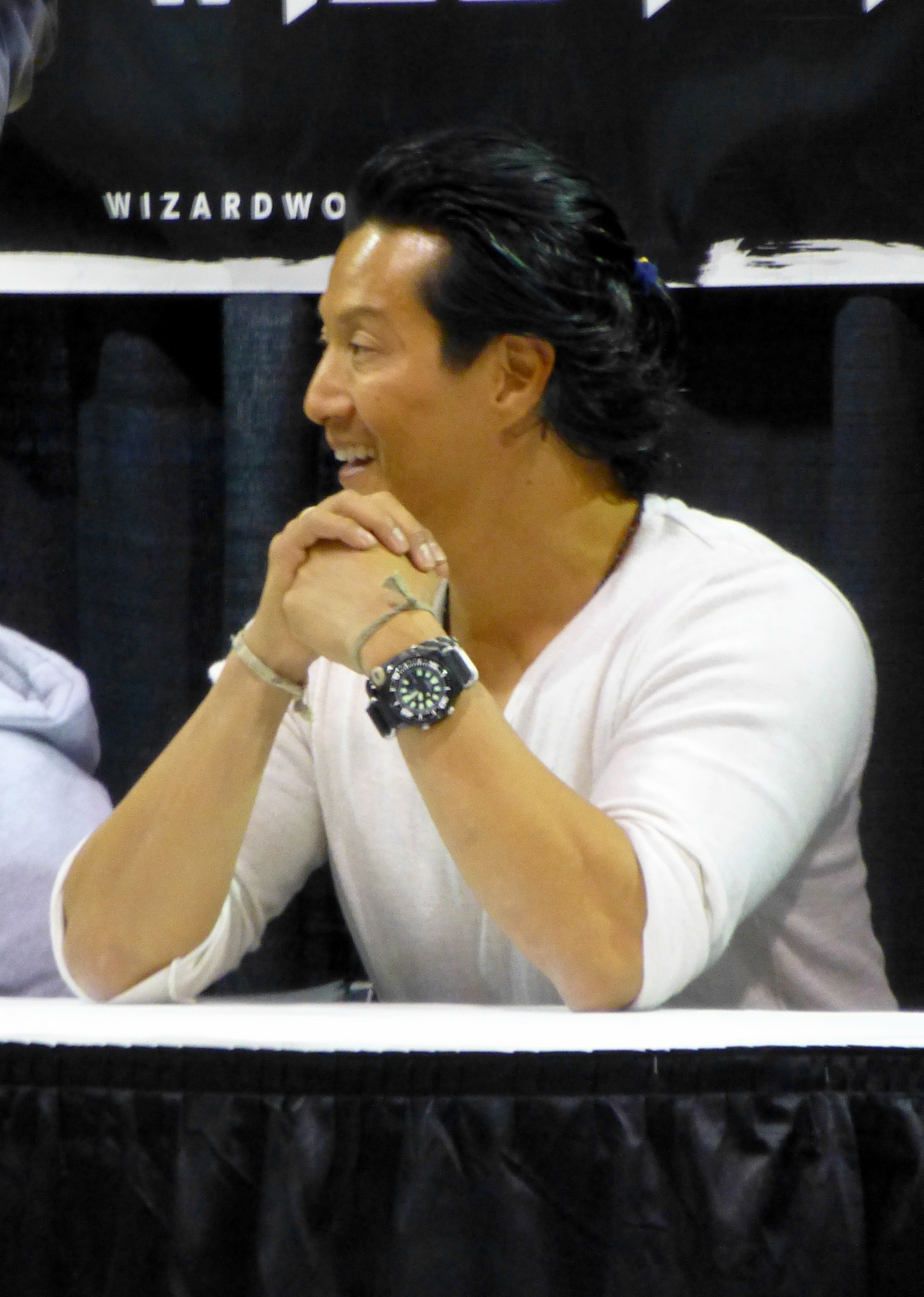
Five actors in total were considered by the developers to voice Wei Shen. American actor Will Yun Lee (pictured) was ultimately chosen for the role.

Black Lotus, being developed by Treyarch in 2007, was cancelled the same year and turned into True Crime: Hong Kong. The game featured a female protagonist and was set to be an action game, with heavy comparisons to Hong Kong action movies, but Activision later decided that this move would not be successful, compared to other games released at the time. Towards the end of 2007, Activision approached the newly founded United Front Games, which consisted of ten people, to develop the idea of Black Lotus into an open world game with a male protagonist. United Front accepted and Activision provided sufficient funding for 180 employees.

A year into development, Activision proposed that Black Lotus be made part of an existing franchise, True Crime. While the original game True Crime: Streets of LA had sold well, sales of its sequel True Crime: New York City had been disappointing, but Activision felt the innovations in Black Lotus could revitalize the franchise and make the game successful in its own right. Activision attached the game to the series and revealed it to the public as True Crime: Hong Kong in November 2009. They delayed the game until 2010 to allow further refinement.

Despite progress in game development, at the release of the financial report for the last quarter of 2010 on February 9, 2011, Activision announced the cancelation of True Crime: Hong Kong. The publisher said that due to "quality issues" further investment would not make the game competitive in the genre even with their most optimistic projections. Although United Front Games shared this sentiment, executive producer Stephen Van Der Mescht expressed in an interview that "True Crime: Hong Kong was playable from start to finish and virtually complete in terms of content" prior to Activision's cancellation of the project. Van Der Mescht said the game "stood apart" from the competition.

On June 22, 2011, Activision CEO Eric Hirshberg explained that the budget and development delays were contributing factors in its cancellation. According to Hirshberg, the increase in budget and subsequent delays meant that the game would have to be a "pretty incredible success" for Activision to have an acceptable return on investment. Due to competition posed by other titles, particularly Grand Theft Auto and Red Dead Redemption, Activision's view was that True Crime: Hong Kong was not at the level of quality that it could compete.

United Front Games cut 120 staff with the company's solvency in doubt until August when Square Enix acquired the publishing rights to the game. Square Enix did not buy the True Crime intellectual property, and retitled the game Sleeping Dogs. Square Enix London Studios general manager Lee Singleton said he recognized the game's playability and potential. United Front Games' President Stefan Wessels stated he was excited to work with Square Enix London Studios. Sixty people were added to the development team and the game was released on August 14, 2012.

=== Design ===
During development of the game the combat system was one of the key focuses. Mike Skupa, the design director, said that the combat was refined using feedback from Square Enix, with references drawn from Tony Jaa's The Protector. The system was designed to emphasize multi-directional combat, strike-based gameplay and environmental interaction. It started as "one big violent sandbox" and progressed to a playable demo. Skupa was pleased with how well the game kept the qualities of the original demo.

The game's designers performed extensive research in Hong Kong to create an accurate portrayal of the city. Art designers spent seven days in Hong Kong, where they studied the city's environment, and took more than 20,000 photos as references for the physical environment in the game. They traveled on foot to various locales, such as clubs and malls, and interviewed ex-Triad members and retired members of the Hong Kong Police Force Anti-Triad unit, which inspired narratives and character design. The sound designers spent ten days in the city overseeing the dialogue sessions on weekdays and capturing ambient noises around the city at weekends.

During the early stages of development, in-game dialogue was recorded in Los Angeles by local Asian actors, but much of the audio was re-recorded in Hong Kong through Drum Music, a specialist recording company. Audio design was complicated; scripting was handled in Vancouver and the recording was in Hong Kong. There were reservations among the developers about the language for the background dialogue; the sound design team eventually prevailed in using Hong Kong Cantonese over English.

In-game radio music was handled by Joe Best and sourced from various music labels. Tracks were licensed from Tsunami Music, Warp Records, Ninja Tune and Roadrunner Records, which lent their names to the in-game radio stations. Through Tsunami Music, voice actors were auditioned and recruited to provide presenters for each of the radio stations in the game. DJs from companies such as Kerrang! also provided voices for the in-game radio presenters. Nathan Wang composed original Chinese songs in the style of Cantopop and Mandopop songs.

== Marketing and release ==
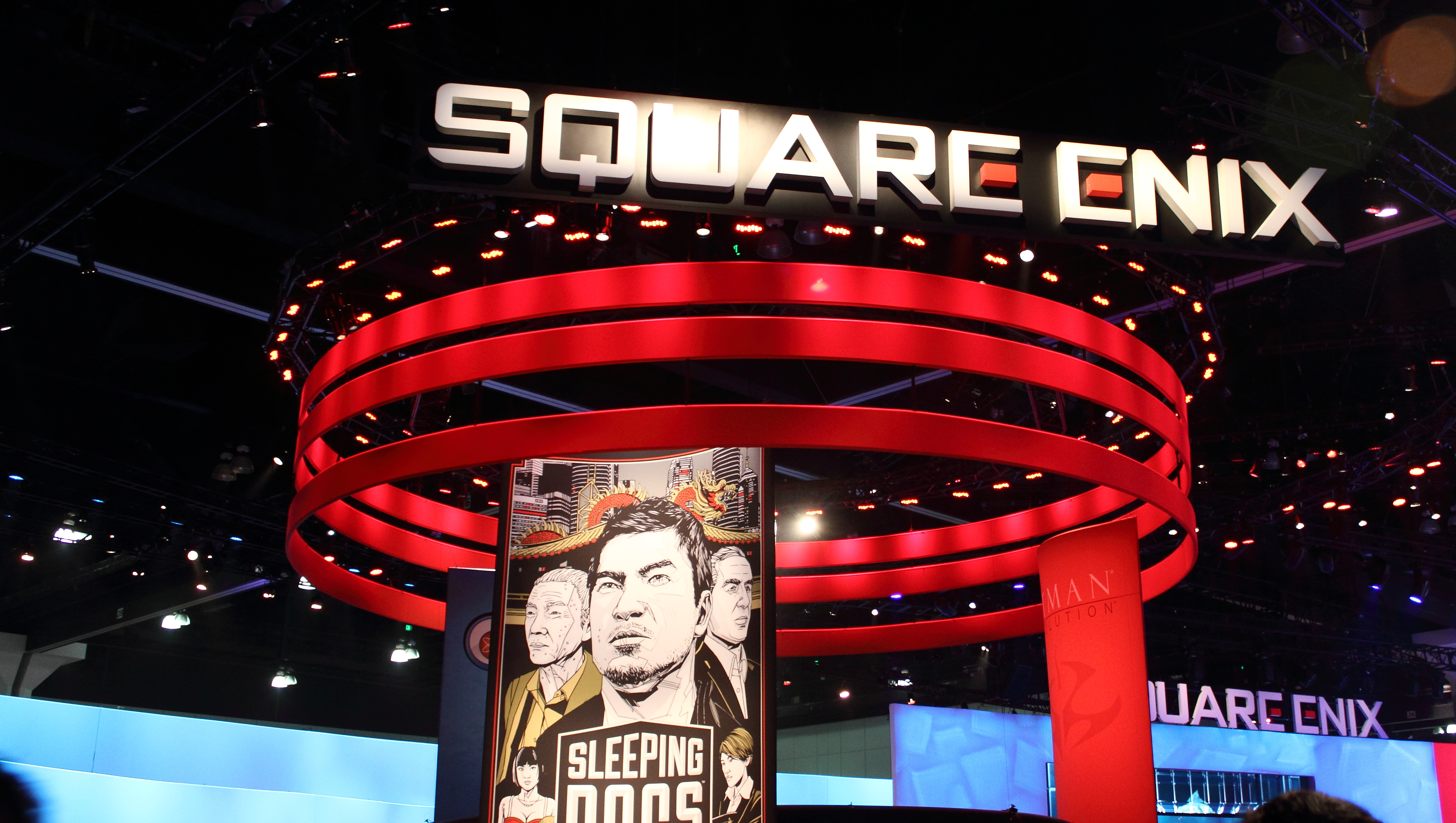
Sleeping Dogs booth at E3 2012

United Front Games relied on viral marketing, such as Internet advertisements and TV trailers, prior to Sleeping Dogs's release. The production team promoted the game with regular communication on social networking websites. They promoted it at video game conventions such as Game Developers Conference, PAX East, MCM London Comic Con, E3, Comic Con, and Gamescom.

Square Enix revealed North American pre-order bonuses for Best Buy, GameStop and Amazon customers in April 2012; each retailer offered its own exclusive in-game content pack. A United Kingdom limited edition release contained two such packs, and an Australian special edition, sold through EB Games and JB Hi-Fi, included all three packs at no added cost.

Further marketing of Sleeping Dogs was via cross-promotion on different platforms; players who bought the game through Steam received an eight item pack for Team Fortress 2, which was later made available for separate purchase, and a Hong Kong-themed Team Fortress 2 level, Kong King. Owners of Just Cause 2 on Xbox 360, PlayStation 3, or PC received automatic access to a Sleeping Dogs character outfit in the style of Just Cause 2 protagonist Rico Rodriguez. The outfit increases the player's action hijack statistics and increases the range from which the player can perform stunt takeovers of enemy vehicles.

The game was released on August 14, 2012, in North America, August 16 in Australia, and August 17 in Europe. The September 27 Japanese release was titled Sleeping Dogs: Hong Kong Secret Police (スリーピングドッグス 香港秘密警察) and was censored to pass the classification by the Japanese ratings board CERO. Differences include penalties for attacking civilians, lack of a street race flagger and a less explicit sex scene. With the exception of Japan, Namco Bandai Partners worked with Square Enix to publish and market the game throughout Asia.

An enhanced version, subtitled Definitive Edition, was released on October 10, 2014, for Microsoft Windows, PlayStation 4 and Xbox One. It includes all the 24 previously released downloadable content (DLC) and features improved graphical resolution and gameplay, setting and audiovisual quality changes based on community feedback.

== Downloadable content ==
"We want to create something to suit everyone's play style from cool cars and high-speed missions to outlandish outfits and game-extending mission packs. The game launch is just the beginning."

— Lee Singleton, General Manager, Square Enix London Studios

Square Enix announced six months of downloadable content to follow the game's release. Packs included content such as outfit items, vehicles, experience point boosts, tasks including money hidden around the city for players to find, vehicle races, weapons, missions and fight movesets. Square Enix released a total of five content packs along with various pre-order bonuses, such as the Dragon Master Pack which was released in November 2012. The last downloadable content for Sleeping Dogs was the "Wheels of Fury" supercar expansion, released in February 2013.

The first story-driven game expansion, Nightmare in North Point, was released in October 2012. Its theme is based on Chinese horror and folklore, and features Chinese vampires known as the jiangshi. In the expansion's plot, Shen's girlfriend Not Ping is abducted by the ghost of Smiley Cat, a former gangster killed by Uncle Po, who has risen up from the underworld as a ghost to take his vengeance on the Sun On Yee. Shen fights Smiley Cat's army of jiangshi, Yaoguai and possessed gangsters, as well as the ghosts of Dogeyes, Johnny Ratface and Ponytail, who reveals that Wei can defeat Smiley Cat by burning the last remnant of his original body. After incinerating his little finger, Cat returns to the underworld and Not Ping is freed. As Shen and Not Ping walk away in relief, the latter turns her head to the camera and smiles as her eyes glow in a freeze frame shot.

The second story-based expansion, Zodiac Tournament, was released in December 2012. The expansion adds an island to the game, with fight arenas, enemies, bosses and outfits. Inspector Teng asks Shen to investigate an illegal fighting tournament held away from Hong Kong. After defeating several fighters in lethal matches, Shen wins and pursues the Tournament Master, who offers to share his earnings in return for his life. Shen declines his offer and snaps the master's neck, killing him.

The third and final story-based expansion, Year of the Snake, was released in March 2013. It adds six missions set after the game's story. The additional missions feature Shen, recently demoted from detective to patrolman, investigating terror attacks around Hong Kong stemming from a cultist group who believe that they will achieve spiritual salvation through the cleansing of Hong Kong residents. Shen must sabotage the cult's activities, ultimately ending in the arrest of the cult master. The DLC adds the ability for Shen to tase and arrest civilians and criminals around Hong Kong, as well as additional collectibles, side missions, ownable police vehicles, and new clothing.

== Reception ==
=== Critical reception ===
Reception

Aggregate score
Aggregator	Score
Metacritic	PC: 80/100; PS3: 83/100; X360: 80/100; PS4: 77/100; XONE: 75/100

Review scores
Publication	Score
Computer and Video Games	8.4/10
Destructoid	9/10
Edge	6/10
Eurogamer	7/10
Game Informer	7.75/10
GameSpot	8/10
GamesRadar+	4.5/5
IGN	8.5/10
PlayStation Official Magazine – UK	9/10
Official Xbox Magazine (UK)	9/10

Sleeping Dogs received "generally favorable" reviews from critics, according to review aggregator website Metacritic. The Academy of Interactive Arts & Sciences nominated Sleeping Dogs for "Action Game of the Year" and "Outstanding Achievement in Story" during the 16th Annual D.I.C.E. Awards.

Eurogamer writer Dan Whitehead called the combat system "robust and intuitive". IGN's Colin Moriarty compared the combat to that of Batman: Arkham City and compared it favorably with Grand Theft Auto IV despite its simplicity and repetitiveness. Hollander Cooper from GamesRadar praised the combat, especially the unique melee attacks. Andy Kelly of Computer and Video Games welcomed the slower-paced missions. Carolyn Petit from GameSpot and Ben Wilson from PlayStation Official Magazine found the combat enjoyable and highlighted the environmental attacks as "empowering and effective". Cooper, Allistair Pinsof from Destructoid, and Edge found the missions generic and linear, a sentiment reserved by Dan Ryckert of Game Informer for the shooting missions. Petit disagreed, saying that the missions were varied and enjoyable. Whitehead and Ryckert complained that there is too little to spend mission earnings on.

The leveling system was described by Ryckert as "stand[ing] out from the open-world pack". Moriarty praised the system for its use of the Face system and the ability to replay missions if unsatisfied. Petit agreed and enjoyed the "pleasant sense of growth" given to Shen by the experience system during the campaign. Pinsof called the system "one of the greatest innovations Sleeping Dogs brings to the genre". Jon Blyth of Official Xbox Magazine liked the "pleasingly absurd" missions needed to gain Face.

Hong Kong as depicted in the game's open world (top) and real life (bottom). Reviewers praised the authenticity and charm of the city in the game, which was considered a departure from the settings in Grand Theft Auto IV and Saints Row: The Third.

Moriarty lauded the game's depiction of Hong Kong as "alive and well-populated" and liked the AI, the setting, and the voice acting, in particular the use of Cantonese and English. Edge gave similar praise: "Offering a view of Asia through the filter of its action film industry, this is a depiction of Hong Kong that could have come straight from the reel." Pinsof acclaimed the city's scale and AI.

Shen and the other characters were mostly well received. Cooper applauded the conflicted nature of Shen's personality as a result of being in an overwhelming situation, arguing that this detail solidified him as a developed and likable protagonist. Cooper found the Triad members unsatisfactory by comparison, comparing them unfavorably with Grand Theft Auto characters. Edge called Shen an engaging protagonist and complimented the other characters, whose voice actors brought life to the characters. Blyth described the cast, aside from Shen, as "brilliantly recognizable stereotypes that have been given enough extra edge for you to care about them", and felt the attitude shifts of some characters were distracting and unrealistic. Wilson said that the characters were "fleshed out brilliantly". Pinsof claimed that the game's premise "grants a perfect excuse for Shen to do terrible things while remaining a sympathetic, level-headed lead." Kelly thought Shen's two-faced nature was the main entertainment factor of the missions. Whitehead found the player's ability to switch allegiances as needed to wear away at "the already fragile grasp the narrative has on Shen's conflicted loyalties."

Moriarty criticized the game's draw distance and texture loading and Whitehead noted some framerate and environmental glitches. Petit said that, in spite of generally convincing non-player character design, "character models look like plastic dolls when viewed up close, and some gestures characters make are rigid and unnatural." Edge stated that character animations in a variety of contexts look "robotic", and Kelly said that "everything in the distance looks like it's been smeared in Vaseline." Pinsof described the graphics as "gorgeous" and conducive to an immersive experience in Hong Kong. Moriarty noted that the game's camera was particularly problematic when driving and less so during combat. Cooper and Edge also criticized the camera.

=== Sales ===
In the United Kingdom, Sleeping Dogs was the best-selling game in the week of its release, and had the fifth-highest first-week sales of any game released in 2012. It retained the top spot during its second week, despite sales dropping by 15%. It returned to the top spot after four weeks on sale. Sleeping Dogs sales rose by 8%, despite five weeks in the chart, defeating new release Tekken Tag Tournament 2. Sleeping Dogs was the 20th-best-selling title of 2012 in the UK and the best-selling original game. According to NPD Group, Sleeping Dogs was the sixth-best-selling game in the United States in August 2012 at 172,000 units. PC sales for Sleeping Dogs were not counted, as it is only available by download in the US.

According to Square Enix, Sleeping Dogs had sold 1.5 million units by the end of September 2012. Square Enix president Yoichi Wada defended the game's sales and said that the firm might have had unreasonably high expectations for the game. He saw Sleeping Dogs as a strong new intellectual property and said that titles such as Sleeping Dogs tend to sell better over long periods of time in the West, unlike in Japan where most lifetime sales are achieved in the first months. On March 26, 2013, Square Enix announced that the game was expected to sell about 1.75 million units in 2013. On September 10, the company announced that Sleeping Dogs, alongside Tomb Raider and Hitman: Absolution, had been successful in their game development, but did not meet sales expectations, and were considered to be "failures".

== In other media ==
=== Canceled sequel ===
In early 2013, United Front was working on a sequel to Sleeping Dogs. The game would have picked up after the original game, once again following the exploits of Wei Shen. He would be joined by a "conflicted, corrupt partner" named Henry Fang, as they explored China's Pearl River Delta. The player would have the ability to arrest any NPC in the world, and influence a branching storyline that swapped between both Shen and Fang. The game was said to be United Front's most ambitious game, which would have included a second screen app for mobile devices that would be able to interact with the world of the game; playing as inspector Jane Teng, the player would "manage the police force and try to control territories" from a mobile device, with the choices made in the game affecting gameplay in Sleeping Dogs 2. The mobile game could be played on its own, with the hope being the free-to-play game would point players towards the console game. Plans for the sequel were eventually scrapped in late 2013 before the project went into production.

=== Triad Wars ===
Triad Wars logo

Triad Wars is a canceled spin-off to Sleeping Dogs, which was scheduled to be released in 2015. The game was initially planned to be released as a PC online game with more massively multiplayer online (MMO) elements, with the central goal being to "rise to power as a criminal kingpin of the Triad underworld". It featured the same map as the original Sleeping Dogs.

In October 2013, United Front Games confirmed that a game, titled Triad Wars, set within Sleeping Dogs' universe was in production. The developer confirmed that it would be published by Square Enix, and would be shown to the public in 2014. Triad Wars was described by the developers as "something we've wanted to do for ages but just never had the chance. But now we do." United Front Games teased that Triad Wars would be a PC online game on September 19, 2014. An announcement trailer premiered on September 22, 2014. In early 2015, the game entered its beta-testing stage. It was announced in December 2015 that the game would be shutting down. Developer United Front Games announced the closure on Twitter and the Triad Wars forums. The developers published a statement saying "We've loved seeing how you've played Triad Wars but we know it wasn't right for many of you."

=== Film adaptation ===
In March 2017, a live action film adaptation of the game was announced. It was to be produced by Neal H. Moritz, with Donnie Yen starring as Wei Shen. A release date for the film was not announced. In February 2018, Yen stated on various social media accounts that the film was in production.

In January 2025, Yen announced that the film was no longer in the works, stating via Zoom to Polygon that “I spent a lot of time and did a lot of work with these producers, and I even invested some of my own money into obtaining the drafts and some of the rights, [...] I waited for years. Years. And I really want to do it. I have all these visions in my head, and unfortunately… I don't know, you know how Hollywood goes, right? I spent many, many years on it. It was an unfortunate thing. Well, onto better things." Later that month, Simu Liu stated on Twitter that he was working to bring the film adaptation to fruition, after having expressed interest in the project in the past. IGN reported in February 2025 that pre-production on the film had started and confirmed that Liu would star as Wei Shen and executive produce alongside Story Kitchen. In October 2025, Liu announced that a first draft of the script written by Tze Chun was completed. In December 2025, Liu revealed that Timo Tjahjanto is set to direct the film.

== See also ==
- List of Square Enix video game franchises
