= Motor vehicle theft =

Stealing a motor vehicle

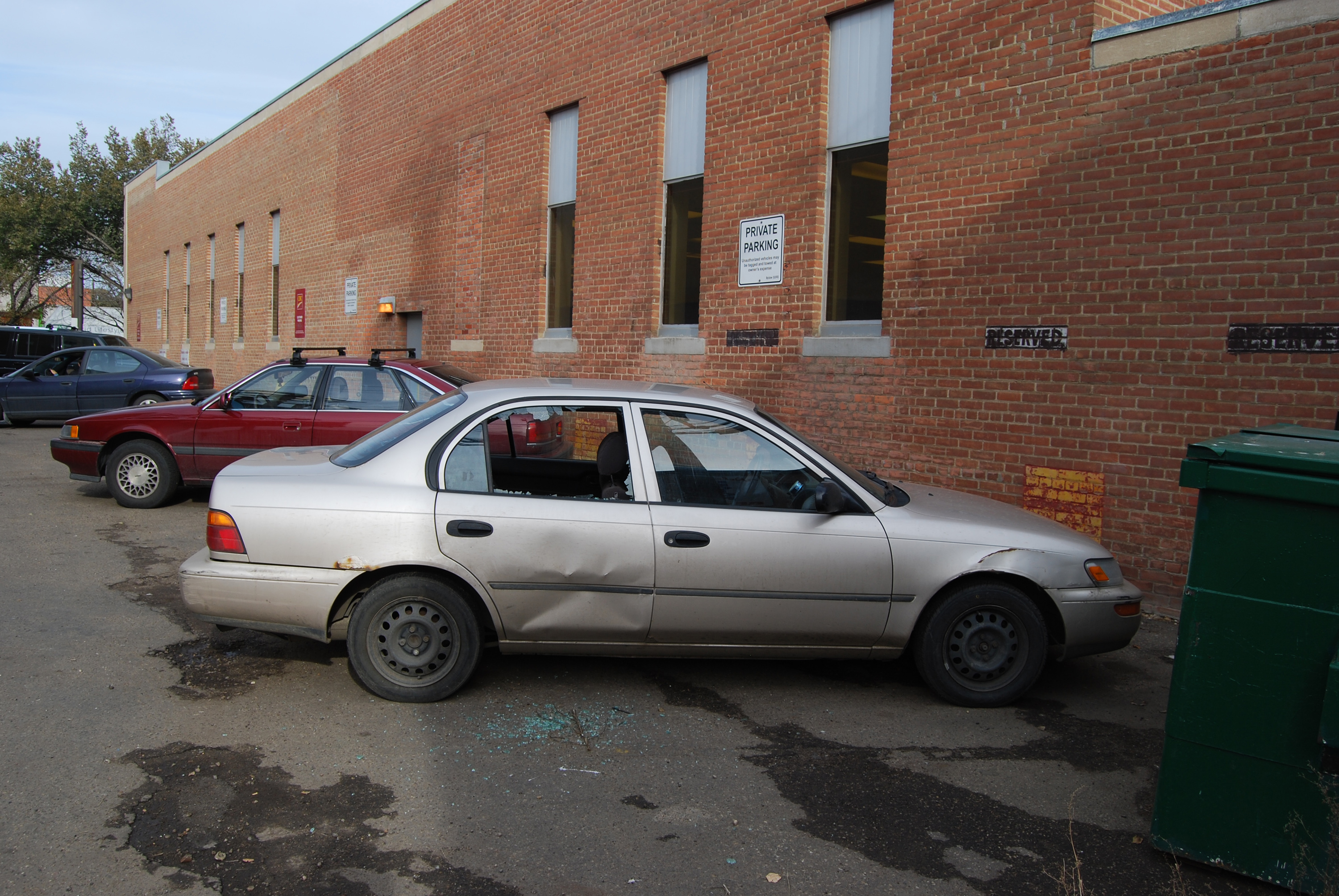
A car with one of its windows broken and a dented car door

Motor vehicle theft or car theft (also known as a grand theft auto in the United States) is the criminal act of stealing or attempting to steal a motor vehicle.

In 2020, there were 810,400 vehicles reported stolen in the United States, up from 724,872 in 2019. Property losses due to motor vehicle theft in 2020 were estimated at $7.4 billion. There were 505,100 car thefts in the European Union (EU) in 2019.

== Methods ==
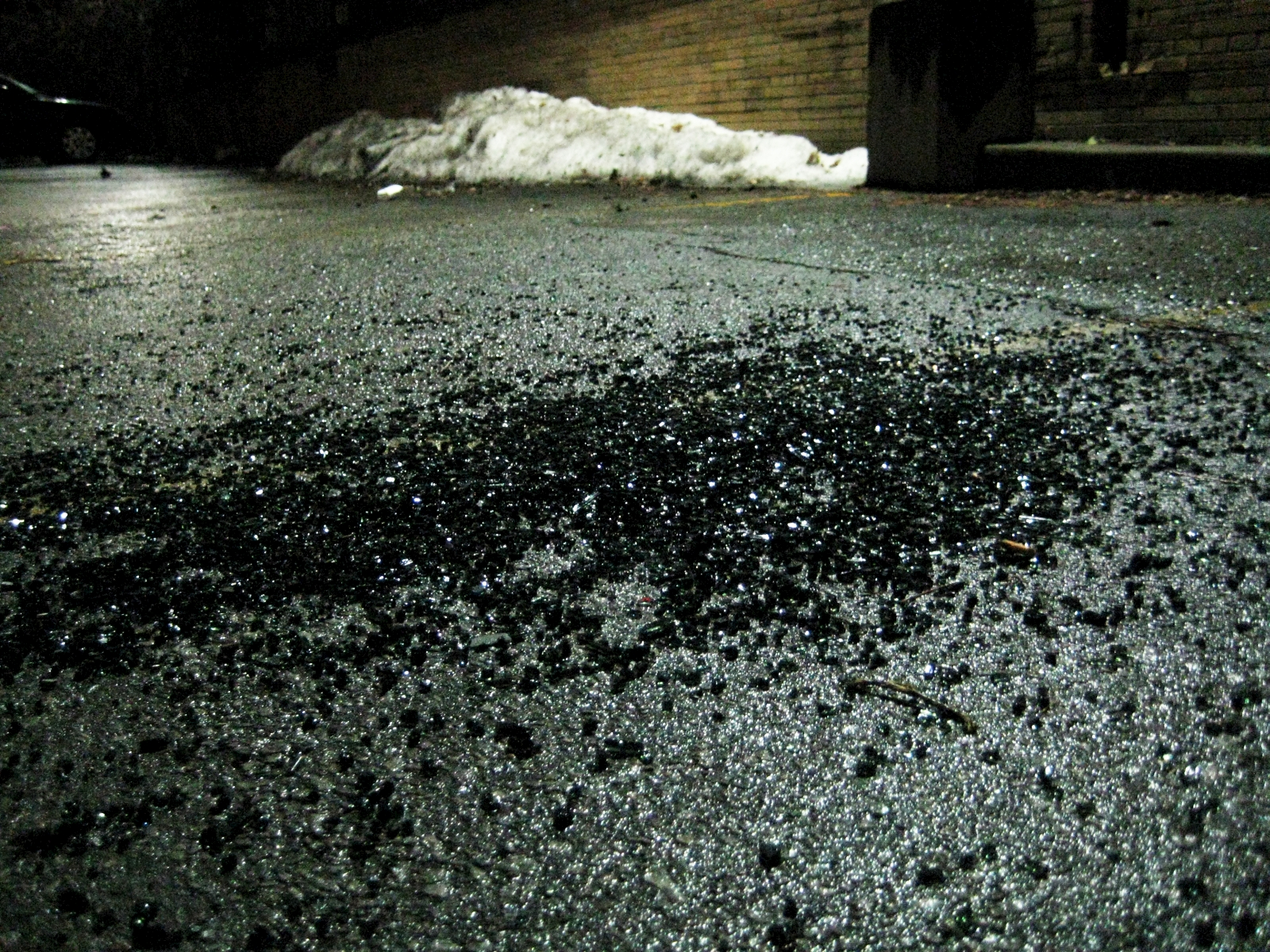
Shattered car window glass where a parked car was stolen

Some methods used by criminals to steal motor vehicles:

- Theft of an unattended vehicle without a key: the removal of a parked vehicle either by breaking and entry, followed by hotwiring or other tampering methods to start the vehicle, or else towing. In London, the police say that 50% of the annual 20,000 car thefts are now from high-tech on-board diagnostic key-cloning kits (available online) and immobiliser bypass tools.
- Taking without owner's consent (TWOC): the unauthorized use of a car short of theft. This term is used in the United Kingdom, as is the derivative "twocking".
- Opportunistic theft: either the removal of a vehicle that is unattended with the keys visible and sometimes the engine idling, or theft of a vehicle offered for sale during what the thief represents as a test drive. A "test drive" may also give a potential thief insight into where the vehicle keys are stored, so that the thief may return later to steal the vehicle.
- Carjacking: taking a vehicle by force, or threat of force, against its owner or operator. In most places, this is the most serious form of vehicle theft, because assault also occurs and the method of taking over the vehicle is essentially a robbery, a more serious form of theft. In some carjackings, the operators and passengers are forced from the vehicle while the thief is driving it. In other incidents, the operator and/or passenger(s) are held hostage in it. In still others, which are less common, the assailant forces the lawful operator to drive in accordance with the demands of the assailant, who rides as a passenger.
- Fraudulent theft: illegal acquisition of a vehicle from a seller through fraudulent transfer of funds that the seller will ultimately not receive (such as by identity theft or counterfeiting a cashier's check), or through the use of a loan obtained under false pretenses. Many vehicles stolen via fraud are soon resold, by the thieves. Using this approach, the thief can quietly evade detection and continue stealing vehicles in different jurisdictions. Car rental companies and car dealerships are also defrauded by car thieves into renting, selling, financing, or leasing them cars with fake identification, checks, and credit cards. This is a common practice near national borders, where tracking devices are less effective because the victims may lack jurisdiction in the countries into which the vehicles quickly are removed.
- Frosting: Occurring in winter, which involves an opportunist thief stealing a vehicle with its engine running whilst the owner de-ices it. Though the term is specific to the UK, the issue occurs in many cold countries where a spare key is used to keep the vehicle's engine on and interior warm while its owner runs into a store or home with a remote lock to unlock it, though the vehicle is often simply left unlocked.
- "Hanoi burglary", where a vehicle is taken during a house burglary, often done with the explicit purpose of obtaining car keys. Named after the first police operation targeting the method.
- Joyriding: refers to driving or riding in a stolen vehicle, most commonly a car, with no particular intent other than the pleasure or thrill of doing so.
- Keyless system theft: The risk of cars with keyless entry being stolen is high. These are cars where the owner does not have to even press a button to unlock as long as the key is located at a certain distance from the vehicle. In theory, the key's signal should no longer reach the car when the driver moves away, making it impossible to unlock the car. Car thieves extend the signal from the owner's key with the help of simple signal amplifiers, or clone the key's RF signal. And then all they have to do is open the door, hit the start button, and drive away unnoticed, leaving the car alarm untriggered and no noticeable damage or proof of the car's theft outside footsteps.

== Auto-theft tools and paraphernalia ==
- A thin metal strap or rod that slips inside a door's cavity at the base of the window, to manipulate an internal locking mechanism or linkage. A famously known tool is called the "slim jim".
- A long rod with a hooked end that slips between door and frame, or through an opened window, that can reach and manipulate the door handle or lock from inside the vehicle cab. (A primary technique used professionally.)
- Broken pieces of ceramic, often from a spark plug insulator, used for throwing at car door windows so they shatter quietly.
- Specially cut or filed-down car keys, numerous tryout keys, jigglers and other lock picking tools.
- Slide hammer puller to break apart door locks, steering-wheel locks, and ignition switch locks by forced removal of the cylinder core.
- Multimeter or electrician's test lamp to locate a power source, for disabling alarms and jump starting vehicles.
- Spare wires and/or a screwdriver to connect a power source to the ignition and starter wires.
- Unusual looking electronics gear that may include laptop or tablet, radio antennas, cables, battery packs, and other modified computer components that look homemade.
- Many keyless ignition/lock cars have weak cryptographic protection of their unlock radio signal or are susceptible to some form of record-and-playback or range extending attack. While proof-of-concept "thefts" of top-of-the-line luxury cars have been demonstrated by academic researchers using commercially available tools such as RFID microreaders, examples of actual car theft using these methods are not very prevalent.
- A firearm, knife or other weapon used to break a window.
- OBD key cloning kit.

== Vehicles most frequently stolen ==
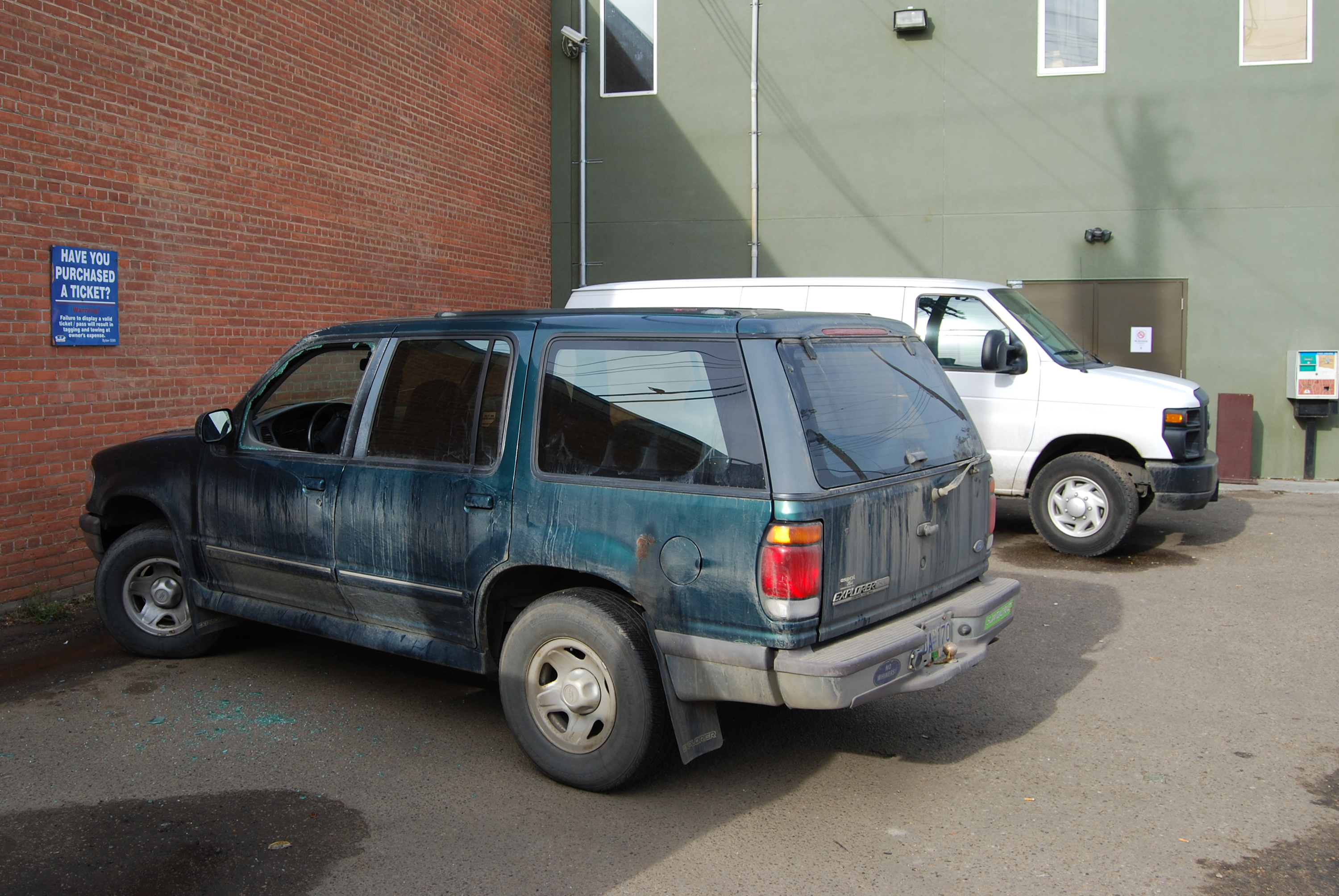
A Ford Explorer with a smashed window

The makes and models of vehicles most frequently stolen vary by several factors, including region and ease of theft. In particular, the security systems in older vehicles may not be up to the same standard as current vehicles, and thieves also have longer to learn their weaknesses. Scrap metal and spare part prices may also influence thieves to prefer older vehicles.

In Bangkok, Thailand, the most frequently stolen vehicles are Toyota cars, Toyota Hilux and Isuzu D-Max pickups.

In Malaysia, Proton models are the most frequently stolen vehicles, with the Proton Wira being the highest, followed by the Proton Waja and the Proton Perdana.

In Indonesia, locally produced MPVs such as Toyota Avanza, Daihatsu Xenia and Suzuki Ertiga are the most commonly stolen vehicles.

In the United Kingdom, the Mercedes-Benz C-Class was the most stolen car in 2018, followed by the BMW X5. Police said the growing number of vehicles featuring keyless entry technology was a contributing factor to a rising number of stolen vehicles.

In the United States and Australia, a design flaw allowing USB cables to substitute for car keys led to sharp increases in the thefts of affected Kia and Hyundai vehicles in 2022. This resulted in a viral TikTok trend known as the Kia Challenge. The Dodge Challenger and Dodge Charger are listed as the most stolen vehicles in the United States, especially those equipped with the Hellcat engine.

In 2024, LAPD accounts over a 1,000 percent increase of Chevy Camaro thefts.

In Israel, according to police data from 2018-2023, the most stolen cars are Toyota Corolla cars, with 6,582 cases, followed by Mazda 3 (5,656 cases), Hyundai i25 (2,738) and Kia Picanto (2,680).

== Prevention ==
There are various methods of prevention to reduce the likelihood of a vehicle getting stolen. These include physical barriers, which make the effort of stealing the vehicle more difficult. Some of these include:

- Devices used to lock a part of the vehicle necessary in its operation, such as the wheel, steering wheel, or brake pedal. A commonly used device of this kind is the steering-wheel lock (also known as a crook lock or club lock).
- Immobilisers allow the vehicle to start only if a key containing the correct chip is present in the ignition. These work by locking the steering wheel and disabling the ignition.
- Hidden kill switches cut electric current to the ignition coil, fuel pump, or other system to frustrate or slow down a thief.
- Deterrents tell the thief they are more likely to get caught if the vehicle is stolen. These include:
  - Car alarm systems are triggered by breaking and entry into the vehicle.
  - Microdot identification tags allow individual parts of a vehicle to be identified.
  - Signs on windows warning of other deterrents, sometimes as a bluff.
  - VIN etching may reduce the resale value of parts or increase risk of resale.

== Recovery of stolen vehicles ==
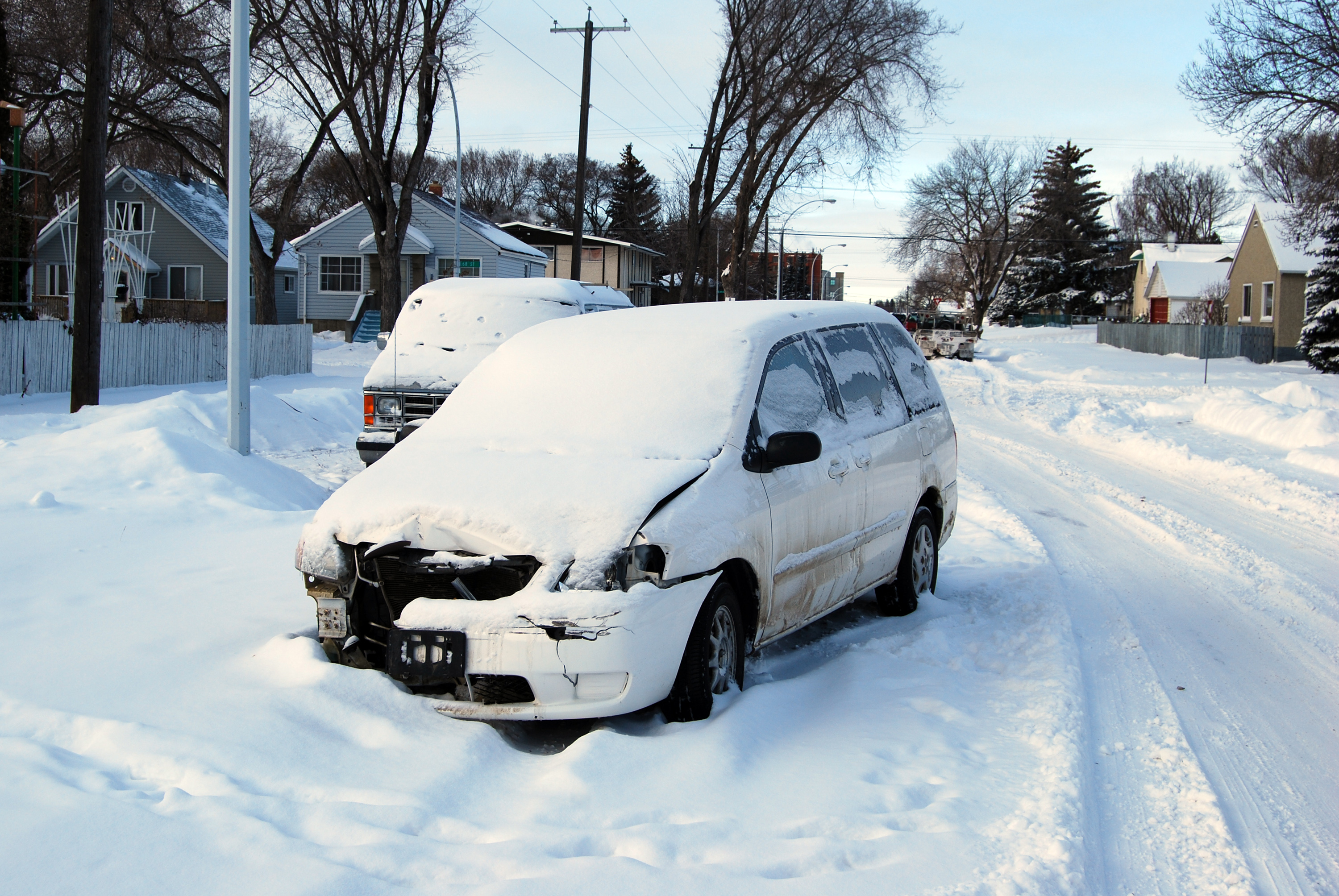
Abandoned vehicle left in deep snow after a joyride in Edmonton, Alberta

The recovery of stolen vehicles is the primary focus of the stolen vehicle recovery industry, which combines technology and services to assist vehicle owners and law enforcement. Recovery rates vary widely, depending on the methods used by police and the types of anti-theft and tracking devices installed in a vehicle.

Police departments use various methods to recover stolen vehicles. These can range from random checks of vehicles to systematically scanning parked cars using technologies like automatic number plate recognition (ANPR), which are often part of broader intelligent transportation systems. Police may also receive tips on the location of stolen vehicles through public-facing websites like StolenCar.com or isitnicked.com in the United Kingdom.

In the UK, the Driver and Vehicle Licensing Agency (DVLA) provides vehicle registration information to certain companies for consumer protection and anti-fraud purposes. This information can be supplemented by details from the police, finance, and insurance companies. Companies that utilize this data include Carfax in the US, AutoCheck, CarCheck, and Check Car Details in the UK, Gapless in Germany, and Cartell in Ireland. These companies provide online car check services for the public and motor trade, with VinCheckFree offering services worldwide.

Modern Vehicle tracking systems leverage telematics technology to enable a vehicle's location to be tracked. These systems are often a key component of a larger Fleet telematics system used in Fleet management. Devices such as a GPS tracking unit or a more integrated Telematic control unit transmit location data to law enforcement or a private company. Commercially available systems include LoJack, OnStar, and various other automatic vehicle location (AVL) services. Some advanced systems also incorporate video telematics using a dashcam to provide visual evidence for recovery and insurance purposes. Other security devices such as microdot identification allow individual parts of a vehicle to also be identified and potentially returned.

== Motor vehicle thefts by country ==
=== Statistics ===
Criminologist Frank E. Hagan wrote that, "Probably the most important factor in the rate of motor vehicle theft is the number of motor vehicles per capita in the country." Using data supplied by the United Nations Office on Drugs and Crime, New Zealand had the highest auto-theft rate for any fairly large country in the world, at 954.0 per 100,000 residents in 2020. Some cities have higher rates, such as Richmond, California, which had an auto-theft rate of 1,518.3 in 2018. The United Nations Office on Drugs and Crime notes "that when using the figures, any cross-national comparisons should be conducted with caution because of the differences that exist between the legal definitions of offenses in countries, or the different methods of offense counting and recording". Crime rates in certain neighborhoods or areas in each country may also be higher or lower than the nationwide rate. Furthermore, because the vehicle theft rates shown in the table below are "per 100,000 population"—not per 100,000 vehicles—countries with low vehicle ownership rates will appear to have lower theft rates even if the theft rate per vehicle is relatively high.

Country	Reported annual motor vehicle thefts per 100,000 population	Year
Albania	4.0	2024
Algeria	2.1	2024
Andorra	0.0	2014
Antigua and Barbuda	62.9	2024
Argentina	85.5	2015
Armenia	1.6	2018
Australia	245.6	2024
Austria	39.3	2024
Azerbaijan	1.7	2024
Bahamas	103.1	2022
Bahrain	97.6	2008
Bangladesh	0.7	2006
Barbados	14.9	2022
Belarus	6.0	2014
Belgium	95.0	2024
Belize	6.7	2022
Bermuda	1213.6	2016
Bolivia	23.4	2020
Bosnia and Herzegovina	4.8	2024
Botswana	5.5	2020
Brazil	112.2	2024
Brunei Darussalam	46.3	2006
Bulgaria	17.5	2024
Cabo Verde	15.6	2018
Cameroon	7.0	2015
Canada	248.5	2024
Chile	499.1	2022
Colombia	111.6	2024
Costa Rica	88.6	2014
Croatia	40.9	2024
Cyprus	9.4	2024
Czech Republic	28.3	2024
Denmark	19.7	2024
Dominica	64.9	2024
Dominican Republic	22.9	2022
Ecuador	80.1	2014
Egypt	22.2	2011
El Salvador	12.9	2022
England and Wales	189.9	2021
Estonia	9.4	2024
Eswatini	28.6	2004
Finland	88.6	2024
France	204.7	2024
Georgia	1.1	2007
Germany	68.8	2024
Greece	179.8	2024
Grenada	0.0	2022
Guatemala	5.5	2024
Guinea	0.5	2008
Guinea-Bissau	0.3	2014
Guyana	4.7	2024
Honduras	2.7	2024
Hong Kong	10.2	2022
Hungary	32.3	2015
Iceland	2.8	2024
India	12.8	2013
Indonesia	6.7	2024
Iran	134.4	2004
Ireland	98.6	2024
Israel	379.3	2022
Italy	230.1	2024
Ivory Coast	7.4	2008
Jamaica	21.5	2015
Japan	14.3	2024
Jordan	3.3	2024
Kazakhstan	20.9	2015
Kenya	0.4	2022
Kosovo	6.6	2020
Kuwait	1.6	2009
Kyrgyzstan	6.3	2020
Latvia	20.0	2024
Lebanon	158.5	2014
Lesotho	22.1	2009
Liechtenstein	50.2	2024
Lithuania	27.2	2024
Luxembourg	367.4	2022
Macau	4.6	2024
Madagascar	0.1	2015
Malaysia	311.5	2006
Maldives	222.5	2013
Malta	41.1	2024
Mauritius	39.2	2011
Mexico	68.5	2024
Moldova	2.3	2024
Monaco	324.4	2006
Mongolia	6.2	2024
Montenegro	6.4	2024
Morocco	5.9	2022
Myanmar	1.9	2022
Nepal	0.1	2006
Netherlands	132.6	2024
New Zealand	952.4	2020
Nicaragua	6.8	2010
Nigeria	1.1	2013
North Macedonia	12.8	2024
Northern Ireland	138.3	2023
Norway	100.8	2024
Oman	2.4	2022
Pakistan	52.1	2024
Palestine	5.5	2024
Panama	18.1	2024
Paraguay	65.0	2015
Peru	88.8	2022
Philippines	4.5	2018
Poland	18.5	2024
Portugal	80.1	2024
Puerto Rico	56.6	2024
Qatar	13.5	2006
Romania	13.9	2024
Russia	21.9	2020
Saint Kitts and Nevis	59.8	2024
Saint Lucia	170.6	2022
Scotland	92.7	2023
Senegal	0.0	2016
Serbia	5.8	2024
Singapore	1.4	2024
Slovakia	14.3	2024
Slovenia	18.8	2024
South Korea	4.7	2022
Spain	49.0	2024
Sri Lanka	2.6	2018
St. Vincent and Grenadines	13.9	2024
Suriname	4.2	2022
Sweden	266.3	2024
Switzerland	358.9	2024
Syria	2.7	2018
São Tomé and Príncipe	0.0	2011
Tajikistan	0.6	2011
Tanzania	11.2	2015
Thailand	2.0	2022
Trinidad and Tobago	37.0	2020
Turkey	37.8	2020
Turkmenistan	0.0	2006
Uganda	3.8	2016
Ukraine	10.0	2020
United Arab Emirates	4.9	2022
United States of America	288.5	2022
Uruguay	476.4	2024
Vatican City	0.0	2024
Yemen	3.9	2009
Zimbabwe	3.4	2008

=== Europe ===
According to Europol, in 2023, motor vehicle crime networks were the most active in Germany, Poland, Portugal and Serbia, with Serbia being the country where most stolen vehicles are stored and cloned before being shipped and sold.

=== United States ===
The FBI reported that the cities where most motor vehicles thefts took place in 2019 were Los Angeles, San Antonio, Las Vegas, Phoenix and Detroit.

== See also ==
- Bicycle theft
- Containerization § Hazards
- Gasoline theft
- Grand Theft Auto – the video game series that centers around vehicle theft
- 2020–2022 catalytic converter theft ring
