= Frost House =

Frost House may refer to:

in the United States

(by state, then city)

- Barnes-Frost House, Southington, Connecticut, listed on the National Register of Historic Places (NRHP)
- Levi B. Frost House, Southington, Connecticut, NRHP-listed
- Frost House (Thibodaux, Louisiana), NRHP-listed
- Cooper-Frost-Austin House, Cambridge, Massachusetts, NRHP-listed
- David Frost House, Cambridge, Massachusetts, NRHP-listed
- Robert Frost House, Cambridge, Massachusetts, NRHP-listed
- Walter Frost House, Cambridge, Massachusetts, NRHP-listed
- Hunter-Frost House, Enterprise, Mississippi, listed on the NRHP in Clarke County
- George Nelson Frost House, Cherry Creek, New York
- Holt-Frost House, Burlington, North Carolina, NRHP-listed
- Josiah Frost House, Menallen Township, Pennsylvania, NRHP-listed
- John Frost House, Brentwood, Tennessee, NRHP-listed

== See also ==
- Frost Farm (disambiguation)
