= Elizabeth Frost Tenanthouse =

Historic house in Massachusetts, United States

- U.S. National Register of Historic Places
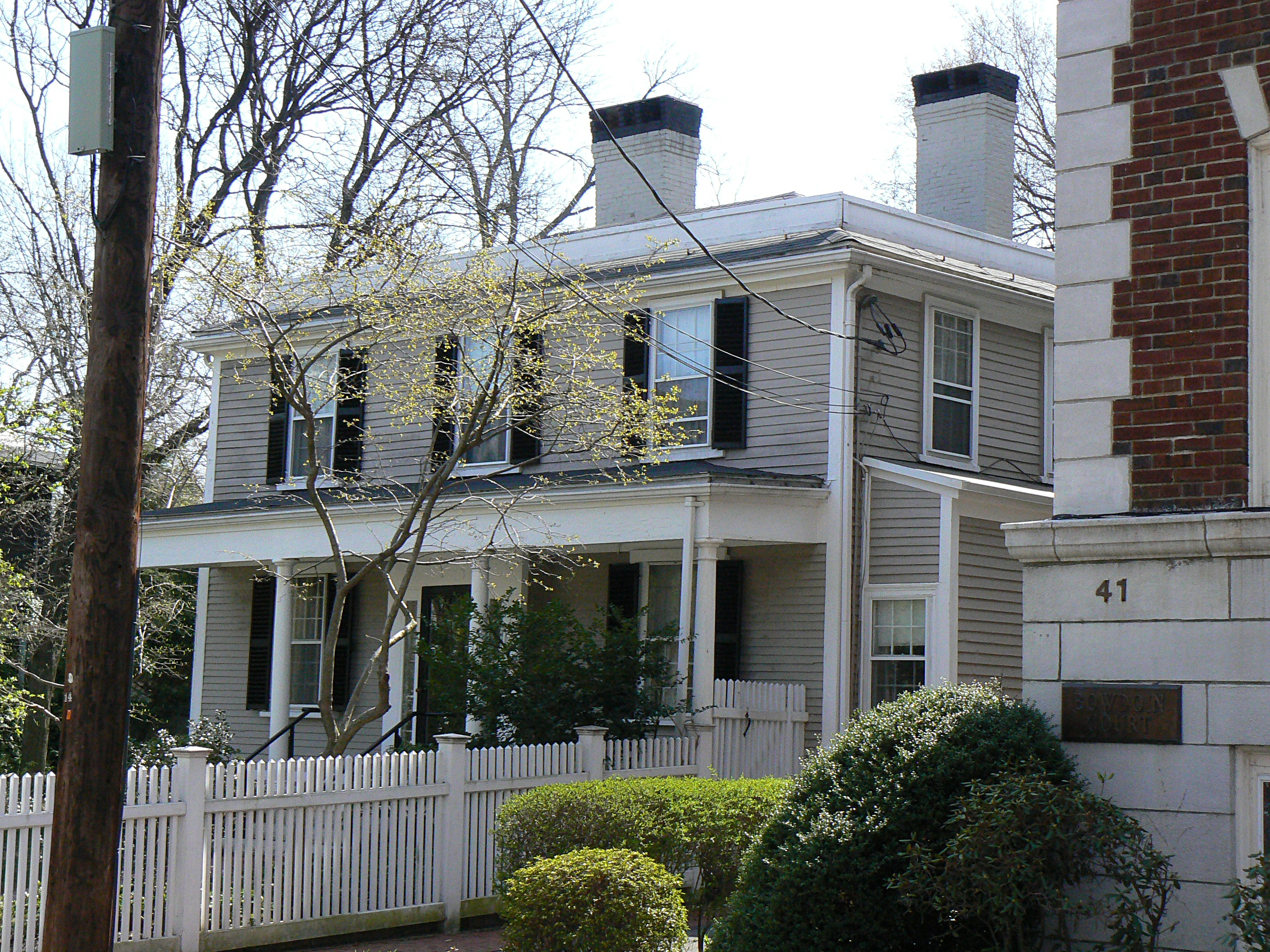

- Location within Massachusetts Location within the United States
- Location: Cambridge, Massachusetts
- Coordinates: 42°23′0.9″N 71°07′18.2″W
- Built: 1812
- Architectural style: Federal
- MPS: Cambridge MRA
- NRHP reference No.: 83000802
- Added to NRHP: June 30, 1983

The Elizabeth Frost Tenanthouse is an historic house at 35 Bowdoin Street in Cambridge, Massachusetts. The two story frame house was built in 1812, and was originally located on Massachusetts Avenue. It was next to the David Frost House, and was moved in the 1840s to its present location to make way for new construction. (The David Frost House was moved to an adjacent lot on Gray Street in 1889.) The house was used by Elizabeth Frost (David Frost's mother) as a rental property.

The house listed on the National Register of Historic Places in 1983.

== See also ==
- National Register of Historic Places listings in Cambridge, Massachusetts
