= Spark plug =

Device that generates sparks in internal combustion engines

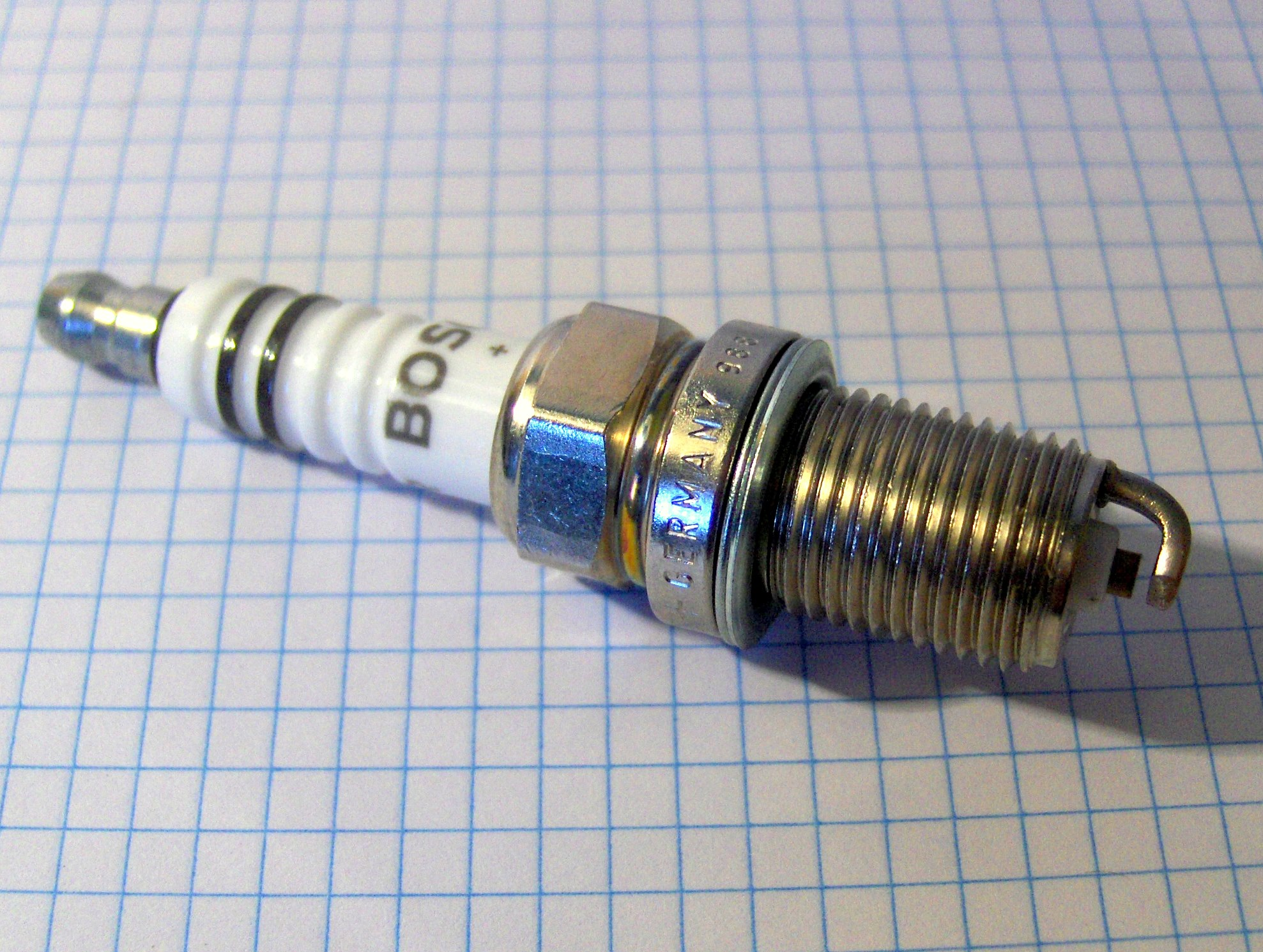
Spark plug Bosch with single side electrode

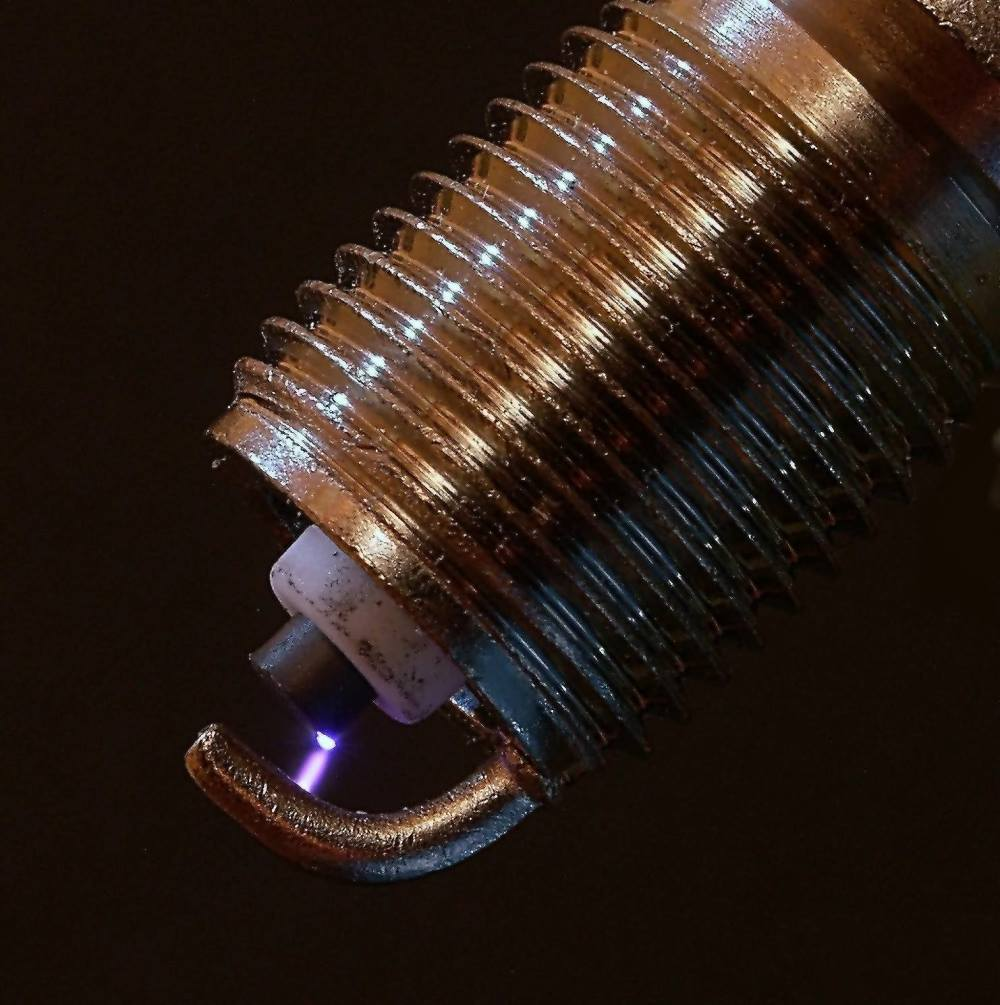
A spark plug giving an electric spark

A spark plug (sometimes, in British English, a sparking plug, and, colloquially, a plug) is a device for delivering electric current from an ignition system to the combustion chamber of a spark-ignition engine to ignite the compressed fuel/air mixture by an electric spark, while containing combustion pressure within the engine. A spark plug has a metal threaded shell, electrically isolated from a central electrode by a ceramic insulator. The central electrode, which may contain a resistor, is connected by a heavily insulated wire to the output terminal of an ignition coil or magneto. The spark plug's metal shell is screwed into the engine's cylinder head and thus electrically grounded. The central electrode protrudes through the porcelain insulator into the combustion chamber, forming one or more spark gaps between the inner end of the central electrode and usually one or more protuberances or structures attached to the inner end of the threaded shell and designated the side, earth, or ground electrode(s).

Spark plugs may also be used for other purposes; in Saab Direct Ignition when they are not firing, spark plugs are used to measure ionization in the cylinders – this ionic current measurement is used to replace the ordinary cam phase sensor, knock sensor and misfire measurement function. Spark plugs may also be used in other applications such as furnaces wherein a combustible fuel/air mixture must be ignited. In this case, they are sometimes referred to as flame igniters.

== History ==
In 1860 Étienne Lenoir used an electric spark plug in his gas engine, the first internal combustion piston engine. Lenoir is generally credited with the invention of the spark plug.

Early patents for spark plugs included those by Nikola Tesla (in U.S. patent 609,250 for an ignition timing system, 1898), Frederick Richard Simms (GB 24859/1898, 1898) and Robert Bosch (GB 26907/1898).

In 1902, Robert Bosch's engineer Gottlob Honold invented the first commercially viable high-voltage spark plug as part of a magneto-based ignition system. This finally made possible the development of the spark-ignition engine. Subsequent manufacturing improvements can be credited to Albert Champion, to the Lodge brothers, sons of Sir Oliver Lodge, who developed and manufactured their father's idea and also to Kenelm Lee Guinness, of the Guinness brewing family, who developed the KLG brand. Helen Blair Bartlett played a vital role in making the insulator in 1930.

== Operation ==
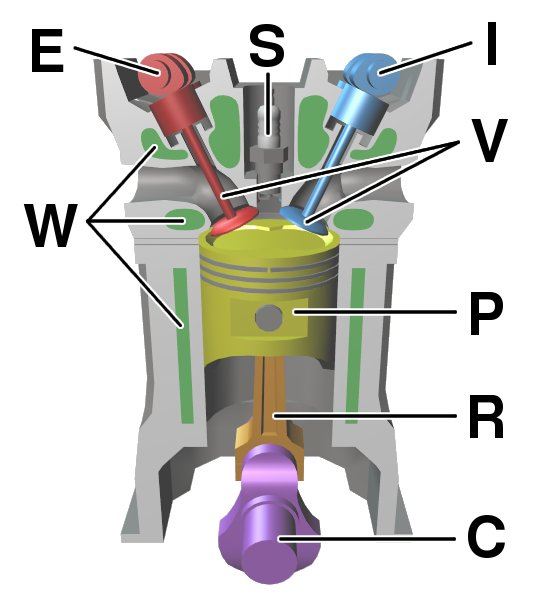
Components of a typical, four stroke cycle, DOHC piston engine.: (E) Exhaust camshaft; (I) Intake camshaft; (S) Spark plug; (V) Valves; (P) Piston; (R) Connecting rod; (C) Crankshaft; (W) Water jacket for coolant flow

The function of a spark plug is to produce a spark at the required time to ignite the combustible mixture. The plug is connected to the high voltage generated by an ignition coil or magneto. As current flows from the coil, a voltage develops between the central and side electrodes. Initially no current can flow because the fuel and air in the gap is an insulator, but as the voltage rises further it begins to change the structure of the gases between the electrodes. Once the voltage exceeds the dielectric strength of the gases, the gases become ionized. The ionized gas becomes a conductor and allows current to flow across the gap. Spark plugs usually require voltage of 12,000–25,000 volts or more to "fire" properly, although it can go up to 45,000 volts. They supply higher current during the discharge process, resulting in a hotter and longer-duration spark.

As the current of electrons surges across the gap, it raises the temperature of the spark channel to 60,000 K. The intense heat in the spark channel causes the ionized gas to expand very quickly, like a small explosion. This is the "click" heard when observing a spark, similar to lightning and thunder.

The heat and pressure force the gases to react with each other, and at the end of the spark event there should be a small ball of fire in the spark gap as the gases burn on their own. The size of this fireball, or kernel, depends on the exact composition of the mixture between the electrodes and the level of combustion chamber turbulence at the time of the spark. A small kernel will make the engine run as though the ignition timing was delayed, and a large one as though the timing was advanced.

== Spark plug construction ==
A spark plug is composed of a shell, insulator and the central conductor. It passes through the wall of the combustion chamber and therefore must also seal the combustion chamber against high pressures and temperatures without deteriorating over long periods of time and extended use.

Spark plugs are specified by size, either thread or nut (often referred to as Euro), sealing type (taper or crush washer), and spark gap. Common thread (nut) sizes in Europe are 10 mm (16 mm), 14 mm (21 mm; sometimes, 16 mm), and 18 mm (24 mm, sometimes, 21 mm). In the United States, common thread (nut) sizes are 10mm (16mm), 12mm (14mm, 16mm or 17.5mm), 14mm (16mm, 20.63mm) and 18mm (20.63mm).

=== Parts of the plug ===
==== Terminal ====
The top of the spark plug contains a terminal to connect to the ignition system. Over the years, variations in the terminal configuration have been introduced by manufacturers. The exact terminal construction varies depending on the use of the spark plug. Most passenger car spark plug wires snap onto the terminal of the plug, but some wires have eyelet connectors which are fastened onto the plug under a nut. The standard solid non-removable nut SAE configuration is common for many cars and trucks. Plugs which are used for these applications often have the end of the terminal serve a double purpose as the nut on a thin threaded shaft so that they can be used for either type of connection. This type of spark plug has a removable nut or knurl, which enables its users to attach them to two different kinds of spark plug boots. Some spark plugs have a bare thread, which is a common type for motorcycles and ATVs. Finally, in very recent years, a cup-style terminal has been introduced, which allows for a longer ceramic insulator in the same confined space.

==== Insulator ====
The main part of the insulator is typically made from sintered alumina (Al_{2}O_{3}), a very hard ceramic material with high dielectric strength, printed with the manufacturer's name and identifying marks, then glazed to improve resistance to surface spark tracking. Its major functions are to provide mechanical support and electrical insulation for the central electrode, while also providing an extended spark path for flashover protection. This extended portion, particularly in engines with deeply recessed plugs, helps extend the terminal above the cylinder head so as to make it more readily accessible.

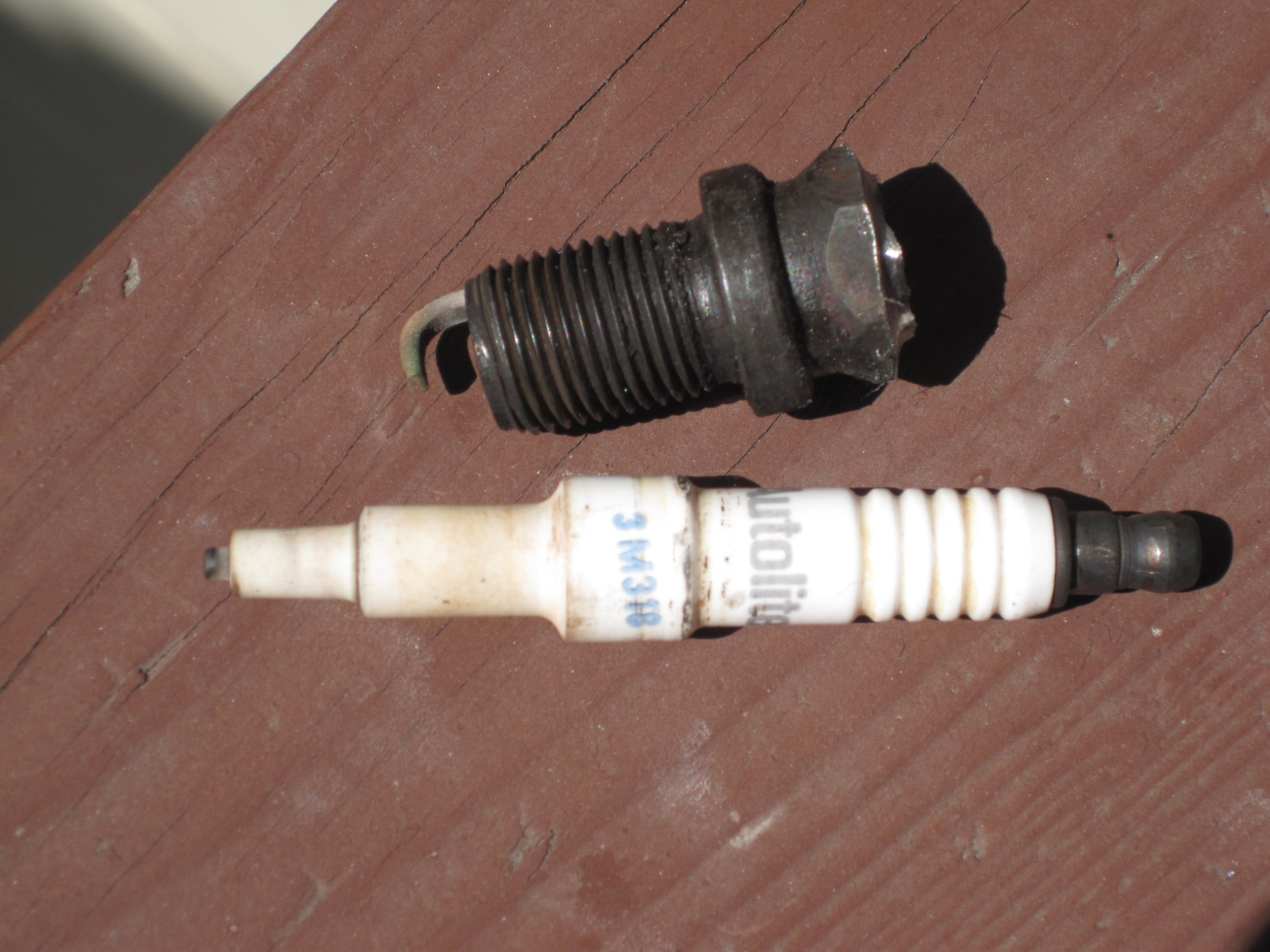
Dissected modern spark plug showing the one-piece sintered alumina insulator. The lower portion is unglazed

A further feature of sintered alumina is its good heat conduction, reducing the tendency for the insulator to glow with heat and so light the mixture prematurely.

==== Ribs ====
By lengthening the surface between the high voltage terminal and the grounded metal case of the spark plug, the physical shape of the ribs functions to improve the electrical insulation and prevent electrical energy from leaking along the insulator surface from the terminal to the metal case. The disrupted and longer path makes the electricity encounter more resistance along the surface of the spark plug even in the presence of dirt and moisture. Some spark plugs are manufactured without ribs; improvements in the dielectric strength of the insulator make them less important.

==== Insulator tip ====
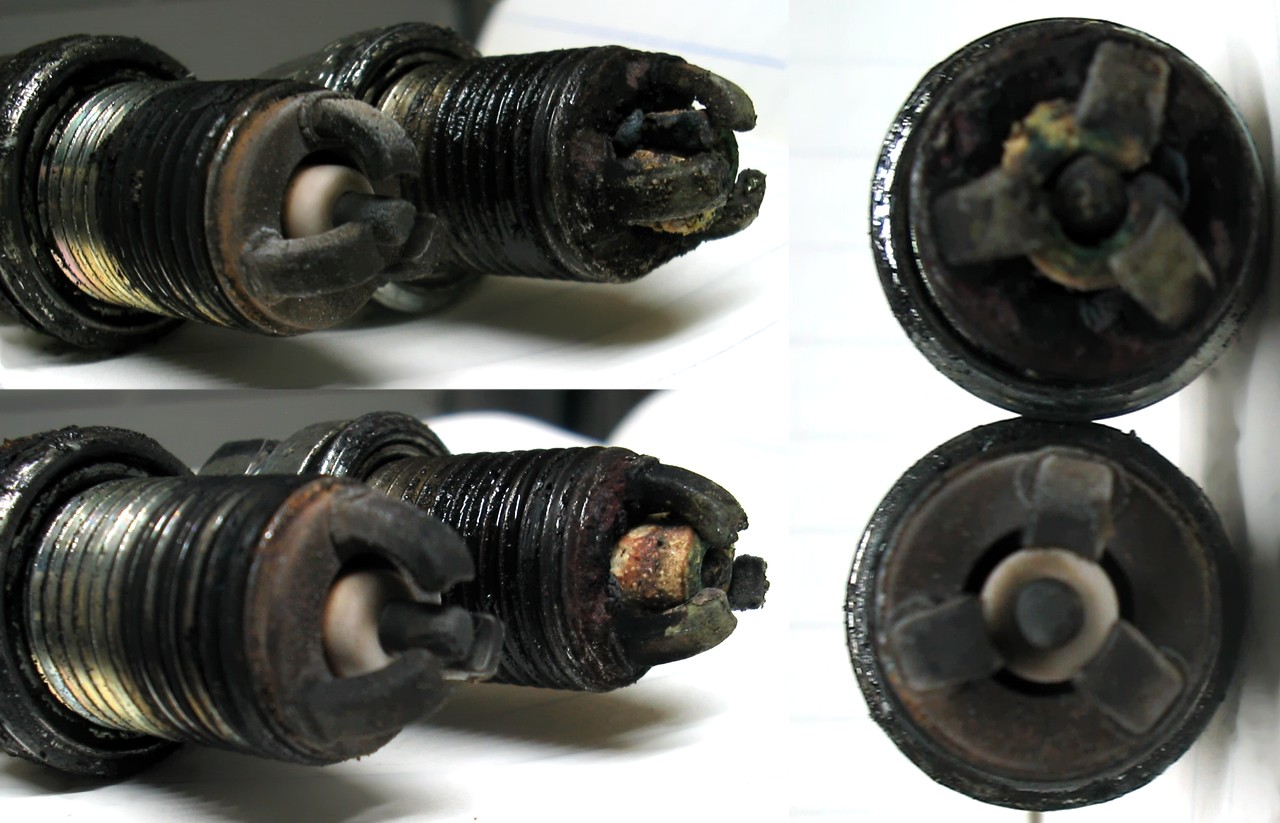
Two spark plugs in comparison views in multiple angles, one of which is consumed regularly, while the other has the insulating ceramic broken and the central electrode shortened, due to manufacturing defects and / or temperature swing

On modern (post 1930s) spark plugs, the tip of the insulator protruding into the combustion chamber is the same sintered aluminium oxide (alumina) ceramic as the upper portion, merely unglazed. It is designed to withstand 650 °C (1,200 °F) and 60 kV.

Older spark plugs, particularly in aircraft, used an insulator made of stacked layers of mica, compressed by tension in the centre electrode.

With the development of leaded petrol in the 1930s, lead deposits on the mica became a problem and reduced the interval between needing to clean the spark plug. Sintered alumina was developed by Siemens in Germany to counteract this. Sintered alumina is a superior material to mica or porcelain because it is a relatively good thermal conductor for a ceramic, it maintains good mechanical strength and (thermal) shock resistance at higher temperatures, and this ability to run hot allows it to be run at "self cleaning" temperatures without rapid degradation. It also allows a simple single piece construction at low cost but high mechanical reliability. The dimensions of the insulator and the metal conductor core determine the heat range of the plug. Short insulators are usually "cooler" plugs, while "hotter" plugs are made with a lengthened path to the metal body, though this also depends on the thermally conductive metal core.

==== Seals ====
Because the spark plug also seals the combustion chamber of the engine when installed, seals are required to ensure there is no leakage from the combustion chamber. The internal seals of modern plugs are made of compressed glass/metal powder, but old style seals were typically made by the use of a multi-layer braze. The external seal is usually a crush washer, but some manufacturers use the cheaper method of a taper interface and simple compression to attempt sealing.

==== Metal case/shell ====
The metal case/shell (or the jacket, as many people call it) of the spark plug withstands the torque of tightening the plug, serves to remove heat from the insulator and pass it on to the cylinder head, and acts as the ground for the sparks passing through the central electrode to the side electrode. Spark plug threads are cold rolled to prevent thermal cycle fatigue. It's important to install spark plugs with the correct "reach," or thread length. Spark plugs can vary in reach from 0.095 to 2.649 cm (0.0375 to 1.043 in), such for automotive and small engine applications. Also, a marine spark plug's shell is double-dipped, zinc-chromate coated metal.

==== Central electrode ====
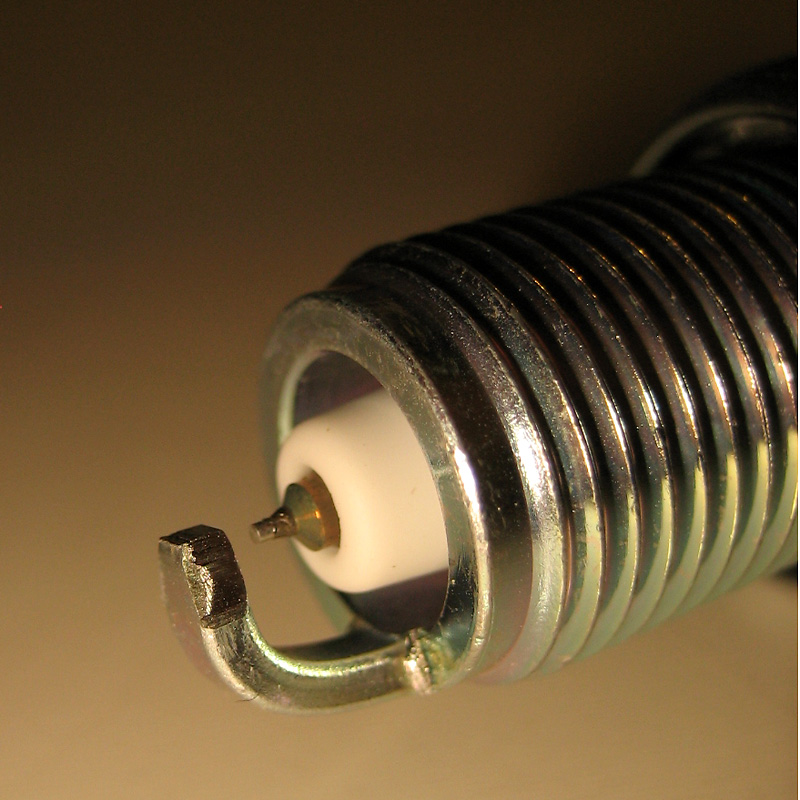
Central and lateral electrodes

The central electrode is connected to the terminal through an internal wire and commonly a ceramic series resistance to reduce emission of RF noise from the sparking. Non-resistor spark plugs, commonly sold without an "R" in the plug type part number, lack this element to reduce electro-magnetic interference with radios and other sensitive equipment. The tip can be made of a combination of copper, nickel-iron, chromium, or noble metals.

In the late 1970s, the development of engines reached a stage where the heat range of conventional spark plugs with solid nickel alloy centre electrodes was unable to cope with their demands. A plug that was cold enough to cope with the demands of high speed driving would not be able to burn off the carbon deposits caused by stop–start urban conditions, and would foul in these conditions, making the engine misfire. Similarly, a plug that was hot enough to run smoothly in town could melt when called upon to cope with extended high speed running on motorways. The answer to this problem, devised by the spark plug manufacturers, was to use a different material and design for the centre electrode that would be able to carry the heat of combustion away from the tip more effectively than a solid nickel alloy could. Copper was the material chosen for the task and a method for manufacturing the copper-cored centre electrode was created by Floform.

The central electrode is usually the one designed to eject the electrons (the cathode, i.e. negative polarity relative to the engine block) because it is normally the hottest part of the plug; it is easier to emit electrons from a hot surface, because of the same physical laws that increase emissions of vapor from hot surfaces (see thermionic emission). In addition, electrons are emitted where the electrical field strength is greatest; this is from wherever the radius of curvature of the surface is smallest, from a sharp point or edge rather than a flat surface (see corona discharge). Using the colder, blunter side electrode as negative requires up to 45 percent higher voltage, so few ignition systems aside from wasted spark are designed this way. Waste spark systems place a greater strain upon spark plugs since they alternately fire electrons in both directions (from the ground electrode to the central electrode, not just from the central electrode to the ground electrode). As a result, vehicles with such a system should have precious metals on both electrodes, not just on the central electrode, in order to increase service replacement intervals since they wear down the metal more quickly in both directions, not just one.

It would be easiest to pull electrons from a pointed electrode but a pointed electrode would erode after only a few seconds. Instead, the electrons emit from the sharp edges of the end of the electrode; as these edges erode, the spark becomes weaker and less reliable.

At one time it was common to remove the spark plugs, clean deposits off the ends either manually or with specialized sandblasting equipment and file the end of the electrode to restore the sharp edges, but this practice has become less frequent for three reasons:

1. cleaning with tools such as a wire brush leaves traces of metal on the insulator which can provide a weak conduction path and thus weaken the spark (increasing emissions).
2. plugs are so cheap relative to labor cost, economics dictate replacement, particularly with modern long-life plugs.
3. iridium and platinum plugs that have longer lifetimes than copper have become more common.

The development of noble metal high temperature electrodes (using metals such as yttrium, iridium, tungsten, palladium, or ruthenium, as well as the relatively high value platinum, silver or gold) allows the use of a smaller center wire, which has sharper edges but will not melt or corrode away. These materials are used because of their high melting points and durability, not because of their electrical conductivity (which is irrelevant in series with the plug resistor or wires). The smaller electrode also absorbs less heat from the spark and initial flame energy.

Polonium spark plugs were marketed by Firestone from 1940 to 1953. While the amount of radiation from the plugs was minuscule and not a threat to the consumer, the benefits of such plugs quickly diminished after approximately a month because of polonium's short half-life, and because buildup on the conductors would block the radiation that improved engine performance. The premise behind the polonium spark plug, as well as Alfred Matthew Hubbard's prototype radium plug that preceded it, was that the radiation would improve ionization of the fuel in the cylinder and thus allow the plug to fire more quickly and efficiently.

==== Side (ground, earth) electrode ====
The side electrode (also known as the "ground strap") is made from high nickel steel and is welded or hot forged to the side of the metal shell. The side electrode also runs very hot, especially on projected nose plugs. Some designs have provided a copper core to this electrode, so as to increase heat conduction. Multiple side electrodes may also be used, so that they don't overlap the central electrode. The ground electrode can also have small pads of platinum or even iridium added to them in order to increase service life.

=== Spark plug gap ===
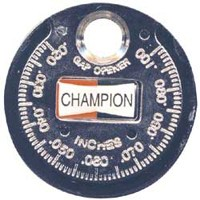
Gap gauge: A disk with a tapered edge; the edge is thicker going counter-clockwise, and a spark plug will be hooked along the edge to check the gap.

Spark plugs are typically designed to have a spark gap which can be adjusted by the technician installing the spark plug, by bending the ground electrode slightly. The same plug may be specified for several different engines, requiring a different gap for each. Spark plugs in automobiles generally have a gap between 0.6 and 1.8 mm (0.024 and 0.071 in). The gap may require adjustment from the out-of-the-box gap.

A spark plug gap gauge is a disc with a sloping edge, or with round wires of precise diameters, and is used to measure the gap. Use of a feeler gauge with flat blades instead of round wires, as is used on distributor points or valve lash, will give erroneous results, due to the shape of spark plug electrodes. The simplest gauges are a collection of keys of various thicknesses which match the desired gaps and the gap is adjusted until the key fits snugly. With current engine technology, universally incorporating solid state ignition systems and computerized fuel injection, the gaps used are larger on average than in the era of carburetors and breaker point distributors, to the extent that spark plug gauges from that era cannot always measure the required gaps of current cars. Vehicles using compressed natural gas generally require narrower gaps than vehicles using gasoline.

The gap adjustment (also called "spark plug gapping") can be crucial to proper engine operation. A narrow gap may give too small and weak a spark to effectively ignite the fuel-air mixture, but the plug will almost always fire on each cycle. A gap that is too wide might prevent a spark from firing at all or may misfire at high speeds, but will usually have a spark that is strong for a clean burn. A spark which intermittently fails to ignite the fuel-air mixture may not be noticeable directly, but will show up as a reduction in the engine's power and fuel efficiency. Gap adjustment is not recommended for iridium and platinum spark plugs, because there is a risk of damaging a metal disk welded to the electrode.

=== Variations on the basic design ===
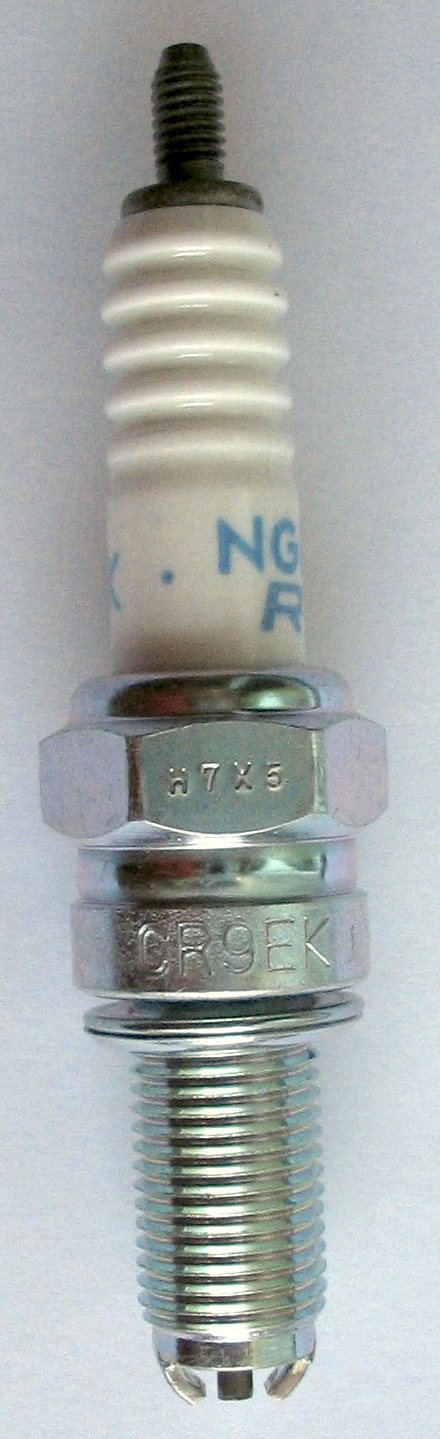
Spark plug with two side (ground) electrodes

Over the years variations on the basic spark plug design have attempted to provide either better ignition, longer life, or both. Such variations include the use of two, three, or four equally spaced ground electrodes surrounding the central electrode. Other variations include using a recessed central electrode surrounded by the spark plug thread, which effectively becomes the ground electrode (see "surface-discharge spark plug", below). Also there is the use of a V-shaped notch in the tip of the ground electrode. Multiple ground electrodes generally provide longer life, as when the spark gap widens due to electric discharge wear, the spark moves to another closer ground electrode. The disadvantage of multiple ground electrodes is that a shielding effect can occur in the engine combustion chamber inhibiting the flame face as the fuel air mixture burns. This can result in a less efficient burn and increased fuel consumption. They also are difficult or nearly impossible to adjust to another uniform gap size.

=== Surface-discharge spark plug ===
A piston engine has a part of the combustion chamber that is always out of reach of the piston; and this zone is where the conventional spark plug is located. A Wankel engine has a permanently varying combustion area; and the spark plug is inevitably swept by the rotor's apex seals. If a spark plug were to protrude into the Wankel's combustion chamber it would be hit by the passing apex seal, but if the plug were recessed to avoid this, mixture access to the spark would be reduced, leading to misfire or incomplete combustion. So a new type of "surface discharge" plug was developed, presenting an almost flat face to the combustion chamber. A stubby centre electrode projects only very slightly, and the entire earthed body of the plug acts as the side electrode. The electrodes thus sit just beyond the reach of the passing apex seal, while the spark is accessible to the fuel/air mixture. The arc gap remains constant throughout the entire service life of a surface-gap spark plug, and the spark path will continually vary (instead of darting from the centre to the side electrode as in a conventional plug). A further advantage of the surface-gap design is that the side electrode cannot break off and potentially cause engine damage, though this also doesn't often happen with conventional spark plugs.

=== Sealing to the cylinder head ===
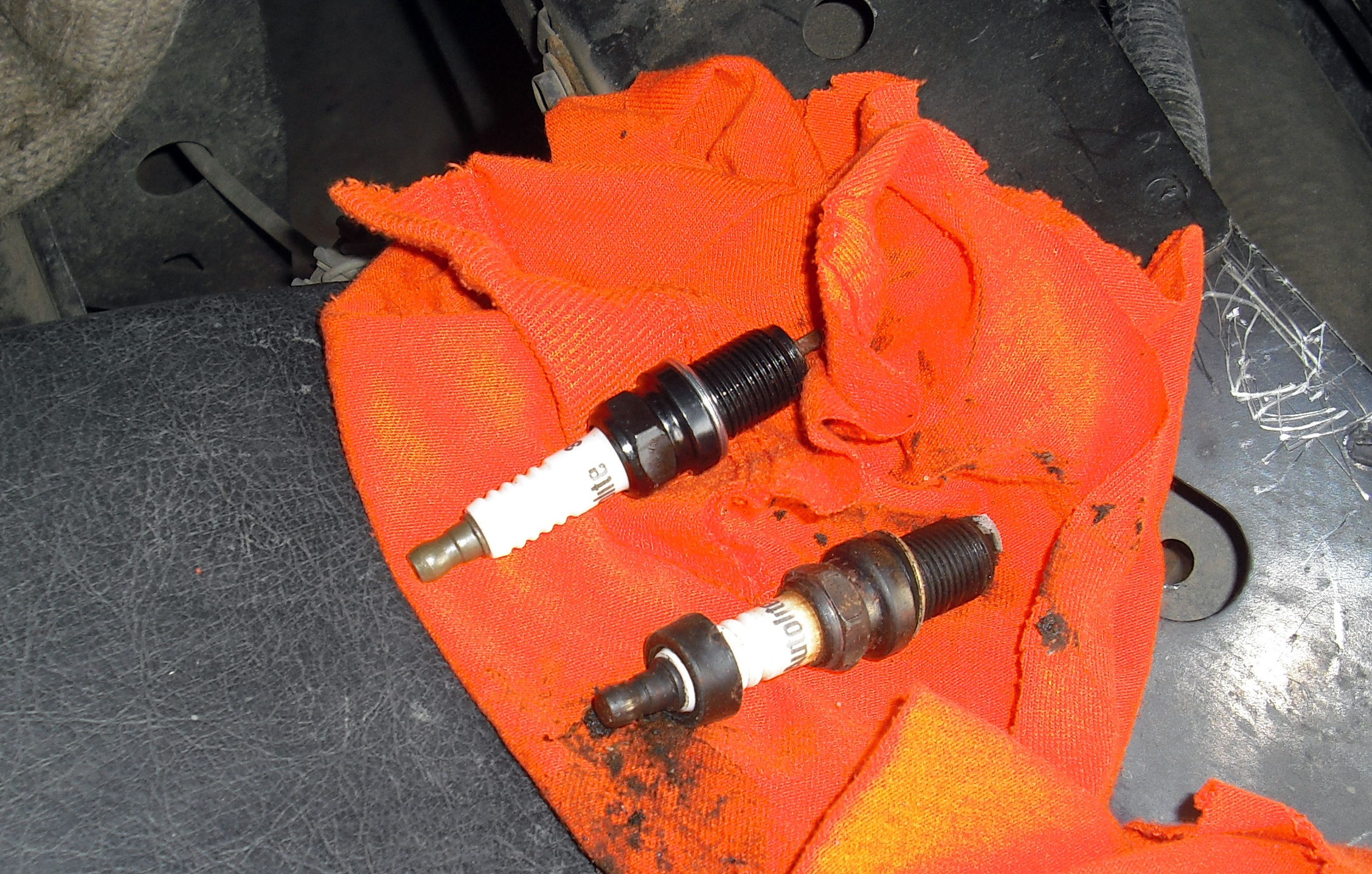
Old spark plug removed from a car, new one ready to install.

Most spark plugs seal to the cylinder head with a single-use hollow or folded metal washer which is crushed slightly between the flat surface of the head and that of the plug, just above the threads. Some spark plugs have a tapered seat that uses no washer. The torque for installing these plugs is supposed to be lower than a washer-sealed plug. Spark plugs with tapered seats should never be installed in vehicles with heads requiring washers, and vice versa. Otherwise, a poor seal or incorrect reach would result because of the threads not properly seating in the heads.

=== Tip protrusion ===
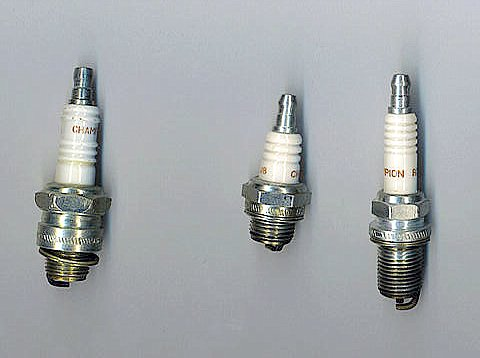
Different spark plug sizes. The left and centre plugs are identical in threading, electrodes, tip protrusion, and heat range. The centre plug is a compact variant, with smaller hex and porcelain portions outside the head, to be used where space is limited. The rightmost plug has a longer threaded portion, to be used in a thicker cylinder head.

The length of the threaded portion of the plug should be closely matched to the thickness of the head. If a plug extends too far into the combustion chamber, it may be struck by the piston, damaging the engine internally. Less dramatically, if the threads of the plug extend into the combustion chamber, the sharp edges of the threads act as point sources of heat which may cause pre-ignition; in addition, deposits which form between the exposed threads may make it difficult to remove the plugs, even damaging the threads on aluminium heads in the process of removal.

The protrusion of the tip into the chamber also affects plug performance, however; the more centrally located the spark gap is, generally the better the ignition of the air-fuel mixture will be, although experts believe the process is more complex and dependent on combustion chamber shape. On the other hand, if an engine is "burning oil", the excess oil leaking into the combustion chamber tends to foul the plug tip and inhibit the spark; in such cases, a plug with less protrusion than the engine would normally call for often collects less fouling and performs better, for a longer period. Special "anti-fouling" adapters are sold which fit between the plug and the head to reduce the protrusion of the plug for just this reason, on older engines with severe oil burning problems; this will cause the ignition of the fuel-air mixture to be less effective, but in such cases, this is of lesser significance.

== Heat range ==
Construction of hot and cold spark plugs – a longer insulator tip makes the plug hotter

The operating temperature of a spark plug is the actual physical temperature at the tip of the spark plug within the running engine, normally between 500 and 800 °C (932 and 1,472 °F). This is important because it determines the efficiency of plug self-cleaning and is determined by a number of factors, but primarily the actual temperature within the combustion chamber. There is no direct relationship between the actual operating temperature of the spark plug and spark voltage. However, the level of torque currently being produced by the engine will strongly influence spark plug operating temperature because the maximal temperature and pressure occur when the engine is operating near peak torque output (torque and rotational speed directly determine the power output). The temperature of the insulator responds to the thermal conditions it is exposed to in the combustion chamber, but not vice versa. If the tip of the spark plug is too hot, it can cause pre-ignition or sometimes detonation/knocking, and damage may occur. If it is too cold, electrically conductive deposits may form on the insulator, causing a loss of spark energy or the actual shorting-out of the spark current.

A spark plug is said to be "hot" if it is a better heat insulator, keeping more heat in the tip of the spark plug. A spark plug is said to be "cold" if it can conduct more heat out of the spark plug tip and lower the tip's temperature. Whether a spark plug is "hot" or "cold" is known as the heat range of the spark plug. The heat range of a spark plug is typically specified as a number, with some manufacturers using ascending numbers for hotter plugs, and others doing the opposite – using ascending numbers for colder plugs.

The heat range of a spark plug is affected by the construction of the spark plug: the types of materials used, the length of insulator and the surface area of the plug exposed within the combustion chamber. For normal use, the selection of a spark plug heat range is a balance between keeping the tip hot enough at idle to prevent fouling and cold enough at maximal power to prevent pre-ignition or engine knocking. By examining "hotter" and "cooler" spark plugs of the same manufacturer side by side, the principle involved can be very clearly seen; the cooler plugs have a more substantial ceramic insulator filling the gap between the center electrode and the shell, effectively allowing more heat to be carried off by the shell, while the hotter plugs have less ceramic material, so that the tip is more isolated from the body of the plug and retains heat better.

Heat from the combustion chamber escapes through the exhaust gases, the side walls of the cylinder and the spark plug itself. The heat range of a spark plug has only a minute effect on combustion chamber and overall engine temperature. A cold plug will not materially cool down an engine's running temperature. (A too hot plug may, however, indirectly lead to a runaway pre-ignition condition that can increase engine temperature.) Rather, the main effect of a "hot" or "cold" plug is to affect the temperature of the tip of the spark plug.

It was common before the modern era of computerized fuel injection to specify at least a couple of different heat ranges for plugs for an automobile engine; a hotter plug for cars that were mostly driven slowly around the city, and a colder plug for sustained high-speed highway use. This practice has, however, largely become obsolete now that cars' fuel/air mixtures and cylinder temperatures are maintained within a narrow range, for purposes of limiting emissions. Racing engines, however, still benefit from picking a proper plug heat range. Very old racing engines will sometimes have two sets of plugs, one just for starting and another to be installed for driving once the engine is warmed up.

Spark plug manufacturers use different numbers to denote heat range of their spark plugs. Some manufacturers, such as Denso and NGK, have numbers that become higher as they get colder. By contrast, Champion, Bosch, BRISK, Beru, and ACDelco use a heat range system in which the numbers become bigger as the plugs get hotter. As a result, heat range numbers need to be translated between the different manufacturers and cannot be casually interchanged as equals.

== Reading spark plugs ==
The spark plug's firing end will be affected by the internal environment of the combustion chamber. As the spark plug can be removed for inspection, the effects of combustion on the plug can be examined. An examination, or "reading" of the characteristic markings on the firing end of the spark plug can indicate conditions within the running engine. Engine and spark plug manufacturers will publish information about the characteristic markings in spark plug reading charts.

A light brownish discoloration of the tip of the block indicates proper operation; other conditions may indicate malfunction. For example, a sandblasted look to the tip of the spark plug means persistent, light detonation is occurring, often unheard. The damage that is occurring to the tip of the spark plug is also occurring on the inside of the cylinder. Heavy detonation can cause outright breakage of the spark plug insulator and internal engine parts before appearing as sandblasted erosion but is easily heard. As another example, if the plug is too cold, there will be deposits on the nose of the plug. Conversely if the plug is too hot, the porcelain will be porous looking, almost like sugar. The material which seals the central electrode to the insulator will boil out. Sometimes the end of the plug will appear glazed, as the deposits have melted.

An idling engine will have a different impact on the spark plugs than one running at full throttle. Spark plug readings are only valid for the most recent engine operating conditions and running the engine under different conditions may erase or obscure characteristic marks previously left on the spark plugs. The most valuable information is gathered by running the engine at high speed and full load, immediately cutting the ignition off and stopping without idling or low speed operation and removing the plugs for reading.

Spark plug reading viewers, which are simply combined flashlight/magnifiers, are available to improve the reading of the spark plugs.

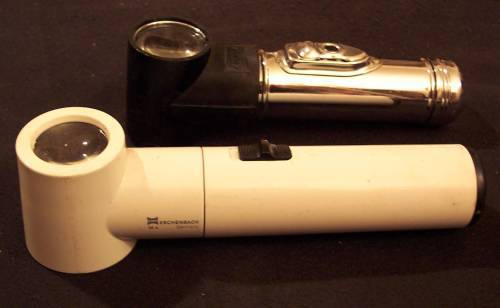
Two spark plug viewers

== Indexing spark plugs ==
"Indexing" of plugs upon installation involves installing the spark plug so that the open area of its gap, not shrouded by the ground electrode, faces the center of the combustion chamber rather than one of its walls. The theory holds that this will maximize the exposure of the fuel-air mixture to the spark, also ensuring that every combustion chamber is even in layout and therefore resulting in better ignition. Indexing is accomplished by marking the location of the gap on the outside of the plug, installing it, and noting the direction in which the mark faces. Then the plug is removed and washers are added to change the orientation of the tightened plug. This must be done individually for each plug, as the orientation of the gap with respect to the threads of the shell is random. Some plugs are made with a non-random orientation of the gap and are usually marked as such by a suffix to the model number; typically these are specified by manufacturers of very small engines where the spark plug tip and electrodes form a significantly large part of the shape of the combustion chamber.

== See also ==
- Coso artifact
- Glow plug (diesel engine)
- Glow plug (model engine)
- Hot-tube ignitor
- List of auto parts
- Ninja rocks
