= Frosting =

Frosting or Frosted may refer to:

- Frost, a thin layer of ice on a solid surface
- Icing (food), the sweet glaze used in confectionery
- FROSTING, a surveillance programme
- Frosting (crime), a form of vehicle theft
- Frosting (decorative arts), a motif in decoration of objects
- Frosted (band), a pop punk band
- Frosted (horse), a racehorse
- Aerosol burn
