= Frosty =

Frosty, Frostee, Frostie, or Frosties may refer to:

== People ==
- Wayne "Frosty Freeze" Frost (1963–2008), a Puerto Rican old-school hip hop b-boy and breakdancer
- Glen "Frosty" Little (1925–2010), a circus clown with the Ringling Bros. and Barnum & Bailey Circus
- Frosty Peters (1904–1980), American National Football League player
- Frostee Rucker, (born 1983), American National Football League player
- Frosty, a guitarist in the American hardcore band Chain of Strength
- Mark Winterbottom (born 1981), nicknamed "Frosty", Australian professional racing driver
- Ross Ulbricht

== Fictional characters ==
- Frosty the Snowman, the protagonist of:
  - "Frosty the Snowman", a Christmas song written by Walter "Jack" Rollins and Steve Nelson, and first recorded by Gene Autry and the Cass County Boys in 1950
    - Frosty the Snowman (TV special), a 1969 animated television special based on the song, followed by three sequels:
      - Frosty's Winter Wonderland (1976), an animated television special
      - Frosty Returns (1992), an animated television special
      - The Legend of Frosty the Snowman (2005), a made-for-video animated film
    - Frosty Returns (1992)
- Frostee, a recurring character in the Filipino comic strip Pugad Baboy

== Food and drink ==
- Frosted Flakes, a sugared breakfast cereal produced by American multinational food processing corporation Kellogg's, known as Frosties in Europe
- Frostie Root Beer, a soft drink marketed by Intrastate Distributors Inc.
- Frosties, a hard-boiled cola or fruit-flavored frosted candy sold in the United Kingdom by the Barratt brand
- Frosty (frozen dairy dessert), a frozen dairy dessert offered by fast food chain Wendy's
- Frosty Boy, an advertising character in Australia and New Zealand
- The Frosties Kid, an advertisement for Frosted Flakes cereal that aired in 2006 in the United Kingdom, the teenaged actor who portrayed the character, or the Internet meme featuring the character

== Other uses ==
- Cape Cod Frosty, an American one-design class of sailboats
- Frosty (Aerosol burn), freezing of the skin due to misuse of an aerosol spray
- Ulmus parvifolia 'Frosty', an ornamental variety of the tree Ulmus parvifolia

== See also ==
- Frosti (disambiguation)
- Frost (disambiguation)
