= Frosti Jonsson =

Icelandic musician

- Also known as: Bistro Boy
- Born: 1 May 1972 (age 54)
- Origin: Iceland
- Genres: Electronic; ambient
- Occupation: Musician
- Years active: 2010s–present
- Label: Möller

Frosti Jonsson, known as Bistro Boy (born 1 May 1972) is an Icelandic musician.

Frosti was the founder of one of Iceland's largest annual LGBTQ+ events, Bears on Ice, which was started in 2005. The first LGBTQ+ event in Iceland, it is not-for-profit, and is still one of the three largest. It features a number of musical acts at different venues over a several day period each September.

Bistro Boy is Frosti Jonsson's stage name, but he also runs Möller Records along with others, one of Iceland's major electronic music label. Bistro Boy has released all kinds of electronic music in the past decades, sometimes with an "ambient" format and sometimes not, and now it's time for a collaborative project, but the album Tengsl was made with the Slovenian musician X.U.L. (Gašper Selko) – the album seeks inspiration from electronic music, classical music and something in between.

Bistro Boy's music is a unique and refreshing blend of electronic genres. His downtempo beats and ambient soundscapes create a sense of calm and tranquility, while his cinematic melodies evoke a sense of wonder and exploration. Jonsson is known for his downtempo, ambient, and cinematic music, which has been praised for its atmospheric and evocative soundscapes. He has been compared to artists such as Aphex Twin, Boards of Canada, and Hammock.

He released his first EP album, Sólheimar, on the Icelandic record label Möller Records in 2012. His first full album, released on Möller Records as well was LP album Journey (December 2013) and in 2016 he released LP album Svartir Sandar. He collaborated with the Japanese ambient/drone artists Nobuto Suda on the EP album Rivers & Poems released in 2015. He has worked with the singer Páll Óskar writing and producing the song "Walk Away" as well as writing the lyrics of the song which is the last song on Paul's album Kristalsplatan.

== Discography ==
- Ambient Short Stories (LP, 2024)
- tengsl (LP, 2022), with X.U.L (Gasper Selko)
- PNO (Compilation album, LP, 2021)
- Drifting (LP, 2021)
- Ambient Theory Of Dreaming (LP, 2020)
- evolve (LP, 2020)
- Broken (EP, 2019) with Bjartmar Þórðarson
- Sunday Coma / Colours (7” with Rayspark Industries, 2019)
- Narti / Smile (7” with Skurken, 2019)
- Píanó í þokunni (LP, 2018)
- Walk Away (single, feat. Páll Óskar, 2017)
- Open Doors (single, feat on Möller Records Compilation Album, Helga Vol.6, 2017)
- Svartir Sandar (LP, 2016)
- Memories (Single, 2016), feat. Edward F. Butler
- Rivers & Poems (EP, 2015), with Nobuto Suda.
- Lovin´life (single, 2015) feat. Anthony Jackson
- Dagdraumaregn (Nýdönsk Remix, 2015)
- Hundslappadrifa (single, feat on Möller Records Compilation Album, Helga Vol.5, 2015)
- U-Bahn (Möller Records Compilation album Helga Vol.4, 2014)
- Frozen thoughts, single feat. Gísli Magna (Remix, 2014)
- Journey (LP, 2013)
- Sólheimar (EP, 2012)
- Motional (Möller Records Compilation album Helga Vol.2, 2012)
