= Ninja rocks =

Broken shards of spark plugs

Ninja rocks is a colloquial term for an improvised weapon or tool consisting of the extremely sharp porcelain or ceramic shards recovered from smashing or crushing the alumina insulator of a commercial spark plug. When thrown, ninja rocks are known to exploit the tensile stress present in the side windows on most cars in order to instantly shatter them, providing a quick and quiet alternative to other window-smashing methods and making ninja rocks ideal for emergencies or "smash-and-grab" auto burglaries, having been used in the latter function since at least 1995. They have no traditional association with the ninja or ninjutsu, only being named such due to their "silent but deadly" function in burglaries and a superficial resemblance to the shuriken stereotypically used as a throwing weapon by ninjas.

== Functionality ==
Ninja rocks take advantage of the physical properties of tempered glass, disrupting surface compressive stress and causing the glass to shatter.

Tempered glass, which is used for the side windows of most vehicles, is manufactured with an extremely high surface compressive stress and high internal tensile stress. This gives it strength and durability against shocks and blunt impact. When the glass breaks (such as in a serious vehicular collision) the internal stresses present in the pane cause the entire pane to shatter into thousands of tiny pieces. This reduces the risk of laceration one might otherwise face when using 'normal' glass, and is an essential safety feature in vehicular design.

It is these physical stresses designed into tempered glass which make it vulnerable to ninja rocks. Made of shards of aluminium oxide ceramic, ninja rocks are very hard, and very sharp. When thrown at tempered glass, the ninja rocks' sharp, hard point focuses impact energy into an incredibly small area without blunting. This disrupts the glass surface compressive stress at the point of impact, subsequently releasing the internal potential energy within the stressed pane, shattering the glass.

To be effective, a ninja rock needs to be sufficiently sharp, impact the glass on that sharp point, and impact it with sufficient force. Thrown ninja rocks may often fail to shatter tempered glass if one of these conditions is not met. Ninja rocks are ineffective against windshields, as these are made of a laminated type of safety glass, and designed not to shatter.

== Legal status ==
=== United States ===
==== California ====
In California, since 2003, ninja rocks have been explicitly listed as burglary tools, and their possession with intent to burglarize is a misdemeanor punishable by up to six months in county jail and/or a fine of up to $1000. Legal records do not use the phrase "ninja rocks", preferring more precise phrases such as "ceramic or porcelain spark plug chips or pieces".

Until 2003, "burglary tools" in California did not include devices to break glass. In late 2001, two important convictions including possession of ninja rocks were appealed. In People v. Gordon (2001) 90 Cal.App.4th 1409 (Review denied), Division 1 (San Diego) of the Fourth District Court of Appeal found that possession of ninja rocks was not punishable under section 466 of the penal code. That court applied the ejusdem generis rule of construction, deciding that ninja rocks were not enough alike the then-listed burglary tools. On the other hand, in In re Robert B. (2001) 93 Cal.App.4th 963, Division 3 (Orange County) contradicted this interpretation of section 466 and upheld the conviction. On February 13, 2002, the latter case was granted review by the California Supreme Court.

Two days later, the state assembly proposed in Assembly Bill 2015 to amend section 466 to include ninja rocks. The bill passed unanimously in both houses in August 2002.

==== Washington ====
One Washington trial court found that the ability of ninja rocks to quietly break tempered glass meant that their possession could be used to establish intent to commit burglary, even in a case where the ninja rocks were not actually thrown at any glass because the burglars had found an unlocked door. One defendant appealed his conviction to the Court of Appeals on the grounds that "the trial court erred by admitting an unusual burglary tool into evidence". The Court of Appeals denied this reasoning and upheld the conviction.
