= Frosting (crime) =

Frosting is a term in the United Kingdom for a motor vehicle theft occurring in winter, which involves an opportunist thief stealing an idling vehicle whilst the owner de-ices it and warms the interior. According to a British insurance company, the crime has contributed to the theft of 135,000 unattended cars between 2000 and 2005 in the UK.
