= John Frost House =

Historic house in Tennessee, United States

- U.S. National Register of Historic Places
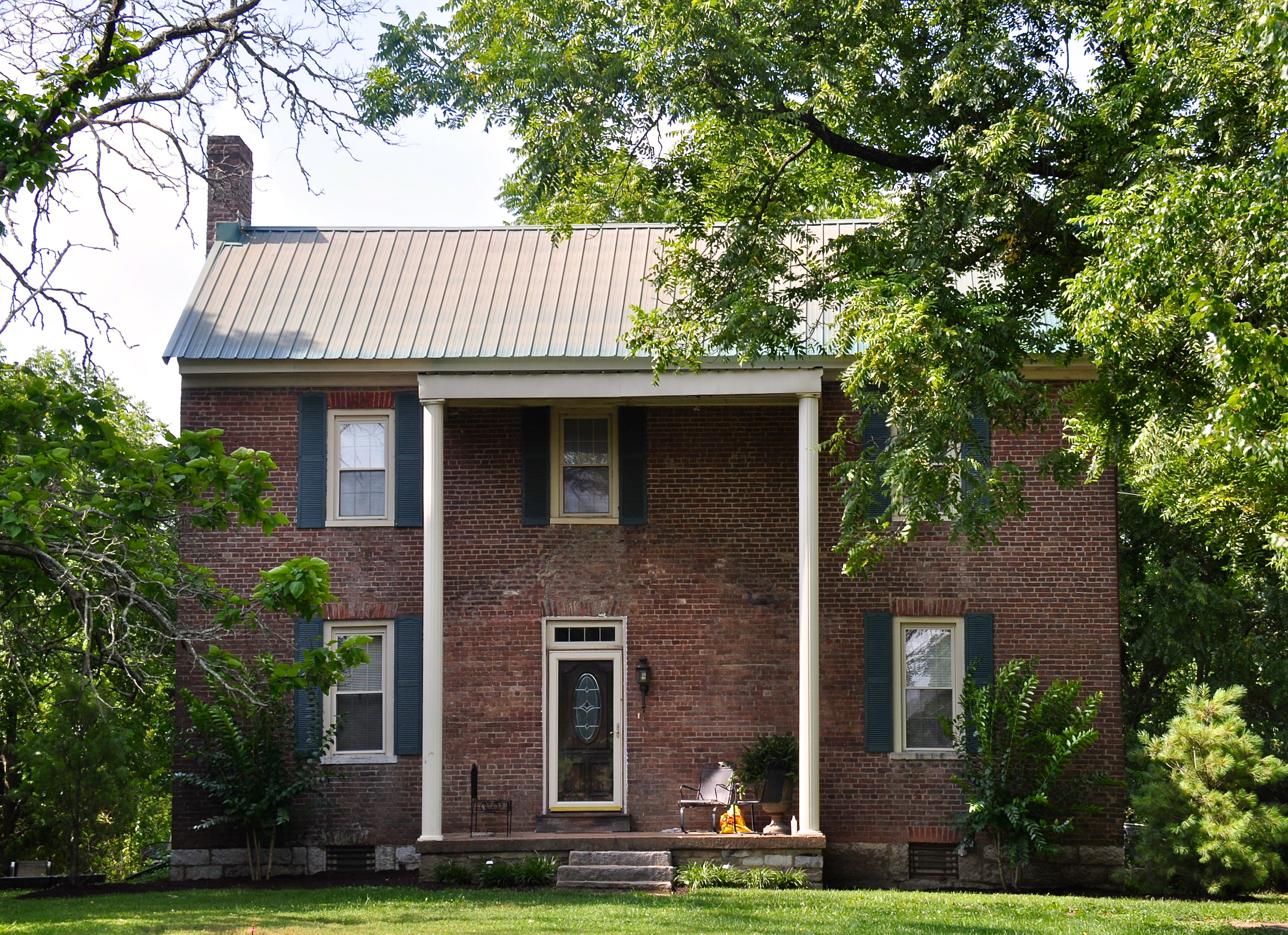
- John Frost house, July 2014.

- Location within Tennessee Location within the United States
- Location: Old Smyrna Rd. 1 1/2 mi. E of Wilson Pike, Brentwood, Tennessee
- Coordinates: 36°1′6″N 86°45′27″W
- Area: 3.4 acres (1.4 ha)
- Built: c. 1810
- Architectural style: Central passage plan
- MPS: Williamson County MRA
- NRHP reference No.: 88000308
- Added to NRHP: April 13, 1988

The John Frost House is a property in Brentwood, Tennessee, United States, that was listed on the National Register of Historic Places in 1988. It has also been known as Cottonport, and dates from c.1810.

When listed the property included one contributing building and one contributing structure on an area of 3.4 acres (1.4 ha).

The NRHP-eligibility of the property was covered in a 1988 study of Williamson County historical resources.

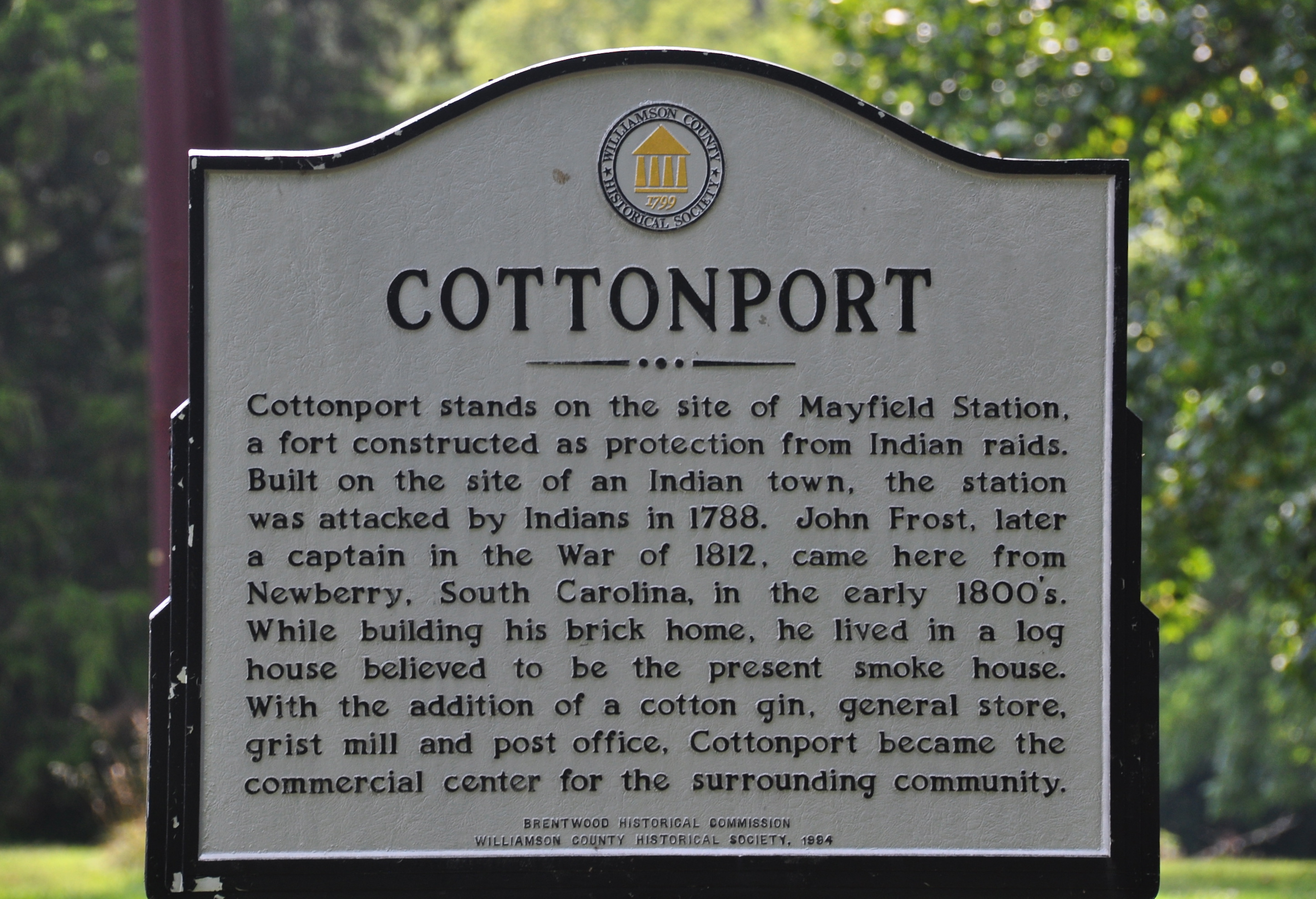
Williamson County Historical Society Sign located near John Frost house (Cottonport) with information about the site.

It is a two-story central passage plan house upon a limestone foundation, with a two-story portico with square posts and balustrade that was added in c.1980. It is built of five course common bond brick. A second contributing building on the property is a c.1830 single pen log outbuilding with half-dovetail notching.
