= Frost (Bailey novel) =

Frost is a novel by Robin Wayne Bailey published in 1983.

== Plot summary ==
Frost is a novel in which a warrior-witch gets herself into even more trouble when she becomes involved in an apocalyptic war.

== Reception ==
Colin Greenland reviewed Frost for Imagine magazine, and stated that "Bailey [...] shares Moorcock's preference for attractive characters with chips on their shoulders, and for sending them on terrifying quests with no information and half their powers taken away before they start. It's hard work, heroism."

== Reviews ==
- Review by Sue Thomason (1983) in Paperback Inferno, Volume 7, Number 2
- Review by David Langford [as by Dave Langford] (1984) in White Dwarf, July 1984
- Review by David V. Barrett (1985) in Vector 124/125
