= Slim jim (lock pick) =

Device to break into cars

A slim jim (more technically known as a lockout tool) is a thin strip of metal (usually spring steel) roughly 60 centimetres (24 in) long and about 2–4 centimetres (0.79–1.57 in) wide originally marketed under that name by HPC Inc., a manufacturer and supplier of specialty locksmithing tools. Slim jims are used to unlock automobile doors without use of a key or lock pick, and are commonly used in grand theft auto. It acts directly on the levers and interconnecting rods that operate the door, completely avoiding the complexity of dealing with the lock mechanism itself. The hooked end of the tool is slipped between a car's window and the rubber seal, catching the rods that connect to the lock mechanism. With careful manipulation, the door can be opened.

Unskilled use of the tool will often detach the lock rods, leaving the lock inoperable even with the key. This is often a clue that someone has attempted to break into a car. Newer cars have also incorporated internal defenses against this tool such as barrier blocks on the bottom of the window, preventing entry, and also shrouding the operating rods and the lock cylinder to prevent manipulation of internal linkages.

There have been unsubstantiated claims that in modern vehicles there is a chance for setting off the side airbag deployment system of the vehicle, possibly causing injury to a person using a slim jim. However, according to research by the National Highway Traffic Safety Administration, this has not been verified and manufacturers state it is impossible. An episode of MythBusters showed experimenters that were also unable to deploy an airbag with a slim jim.
