= David Frost House =

Historic house in Massachusetts, United States

- U.S. National Register of Historic Places
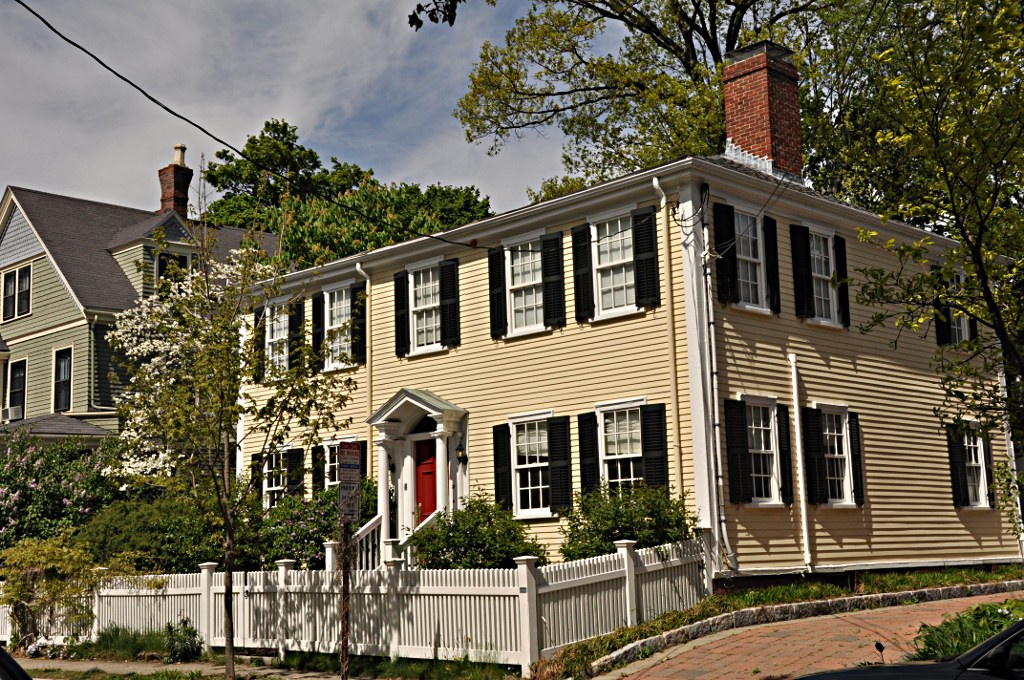

- Location within Massachusetts Location within the United States
- Location: Cambridge, Massachusetts
- Coordinates: 42°23′0.1″N 71°07′19.7″W
- Built: 1815
- Architectural style: Federal
- MPS: Cambridge MRA
- NRHP reference No.: 83000801
- Added to NRHP: June 30, 1983

The David Frost House is an historic house at 26 Gray Street in Cambridge, Massachusetts. It is a 2 1/2-story wood-frame house, five bays wide, with twin interior chimneys and a typical Federal period center-hall plan. It was built in 1815, and was originally located on Massachusetts Avenue, then a relatively rural area. It was relocated to its present site in 1889, when Massachusetts Avenue became a desirable location to build larger, more fashionable houses, after the arrival of public transit.

The house was built in 1815 and added to the National Register of Historic Places in 1983.

== See also ==
- National Register of Historic Places listings in Cambridge, Massachusetts
