= Frost (surname) =

Frost is a surname. Notable people with the surname include:

- Alex Frost (born 1987), American actor
- Andrew Frost (disambiguation), several people
- Anthony Frost (born 1951), English abstract artist
- Arthur Burdett Frost (1851–1928), American illustrator and graphic artist
- Dame Barbara Frost (born 1952), British charity executive
- Bede Frost (1875–1961), English priest
- Carol D. Frost (born 1957), American geologist
- Charles Frost (disambiguation), several people
- Craig Frost (born 1948), American musician
- Dan Frost (disambiguation), several people
- Daniel Frost (disambiguation), several people
- Darrel Frost (born 1951), American herpetologist
- David Frost (disambiguation), several people
- Derrick Frost (born 1980), American footballer
- Doug Frost (swimming coach) (born 1943), Australian swimming coach
- Doug Frost (wine), American Master of Wine, Master Sommelier and author
- Edwin Brant Frost (1855–1935), American astronomer
- Emma Frost, British screenwriter and producer
- Eunice Frost (1914–1998), British publisher
- Francis Theodore Frost (1843–1916), Canadian manufacturer and politician
- Frank Frost (disambiguation), several people
- Gavin Frost (1930–2016), British occult author and Wiccan
- Graham Frost (born 1947), English cricketer
- Harry Frost (1914–1973), Canadian ice hockey player
- Harry Frost (rugby union) (1869–1954), New Zealand rugby player
- Heinrich Adolph Frost (1844–1909), German businessman
- Henry Atherton Frost (1883–1952), American architect
- Hildreth Frost (1880–1955), Colorado lawyer and soldier
- Honor Frost (1917–2010), British pioneer of underwater archaeology
- Jack Frost (disambiguation), several people
- James Frost (disambiguation), several people
- Jenny Frost (born 1978), British singer and model
- Joanne (Jo) Frost (born 1970), English television personality, nanny, and author
- John Frost (disambiguation), several people
- Joseph H. Frost (1805–1866), American missionary
- Julie Frost (born 1970), American songwriter, singer, guitarist and record producer
- Kelly Frost (born 1999), British writer
- Kenneth Frost (1934–2013), American astrophysicist
- Kid Frost (born 1964), Mexican-American hip-hop artist
- Lane Frost (1963–1989), American bull rider
- Lauren Frost (born 1985), American actress
- Laurence Hugh Frost (1902–1977), American Admiral
- Lee Frost (director) (1935–2007), American film director
- Lee Frost (footballer) (born 1957), English footballer
- Leslie Frost (1895–1973), Canadian politician
- Lilian Frost (c. 1871–1953), Australian organist
- Lindsay Frost (born 1962), American actress
- Mark Frost (disambiguation), several people
- Marshall Frost (born 2005), British trampoline gymnast
- Martin Frost (born 1942), American politician
- Mary Frost Plumstead (1905-1980), British composer
- Maxwell Frost (born 1997), American politician
- Merit Frost Lindberg (born 1973), Swedish politician
- Mervyn Frost (born 1947), British political scientist
- Michael Frost (disambiguation), several people
- Morgan Frost (born 1999), Canadian ice hockey player
- Morten Frost (born 1948), Danish badminton player
- Nick Frost (born 1972), English actor and comedian
- Olive Grey Frost, one of several wives of Joseph Smith Jr.
- Peter Frost, British writer, photographer, and archaeologist
- Polly Frost, American journalist
- Robert Frost (disambiguation), several people
- Royal Harwood Frost (1879–1950), American astronomer
- Sadie Frost (born 1965), English actress and fashion designer
- Scott Frost (born 1965), American football coach
- Scott Frost (writer), American screenwriter and novelist
- Sharon Frost, American politician
- Sherry Frost, American politician
- Stef Frost (born 1989), English professional footballer
- Stephen Frost (born 1955), English comedian
- Stephen James Frost (born 1972), Texan politician
- Stuart W. Frost (1891–1990), American entomologist
- Terry Frost (1915–2003), English abstract artist
- Terry Frost (actor) (1906–1993), American actor
- Thomas Frost (disambiguation), several people
- Tony Frost (born 1975), English cricketer
- Tyler Frost (born 1999), English footballer
- Wade Hampton Frost (1880–1938), American epidemiologist
- Warren Frost (1925–2017), American actor
- William Frost (disambiguation), several people
- Wilson Frost (1925–2018), American lawyer and politician
- Wenlan Hu Frost (born 1958), Chinese-American artist

== See also ==
- Forst (disambiguation)
- Jack Frost, Nordic folk personification of the cold
