= Kelly Frost (disambiguation) =

Kelly Frost is a British writer.

Kelly or Kellie Frost may also refer to:

- Kelly Frost, Sr. and Kelly Frost, Jr., presenters on KQMS (AM)
- Kelly Frost, actress in the TV series Oasis
- Kellie Frost, a character in 8 Seconds
- Kelly Frost, a character in Eleventh Hour, played by Lindsay Pulsipher
