= National Tramway Museum =

Tram museum in Derbyshire, England

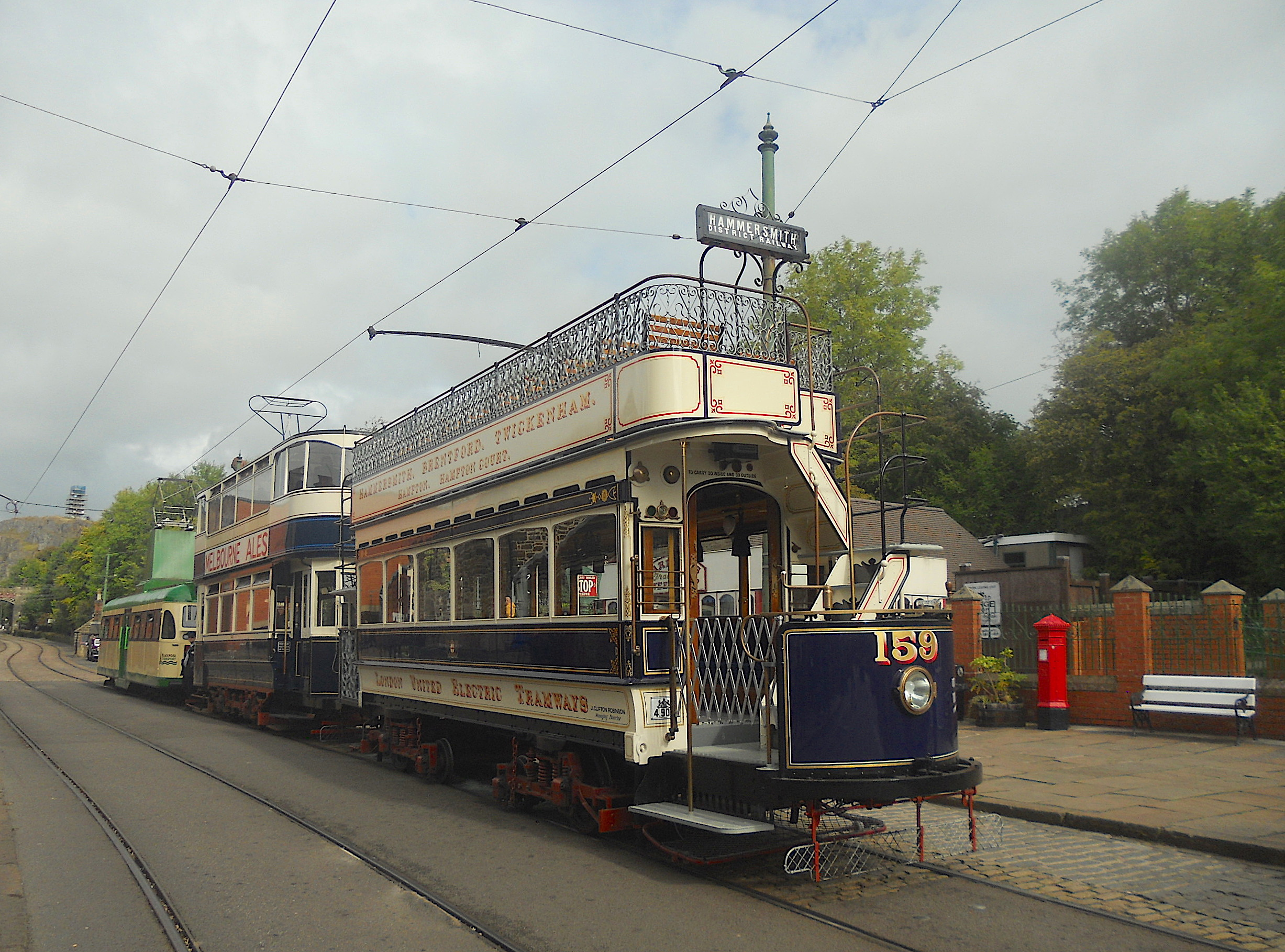
- The museum features working trams in a traditional street setting. A line up of such trams is seen here at the Town End terminus in 2017
- Established: 1963; 63 years ago
- Location: Crich, Amber Valley, Derbyshire, England
- Coordinates: 53.0893°N 1.4863°W
- Type: Transport museum
- Owner: Tramway Museum Society
- Website: tramway.co.uk

The National Tramway Museum is a transport museum located in the village and civil parish of Crich, in the Amber Valley district of Derbyshire, England. The museum's collection of trams is officially designated as being of national importance and encompasses the 1860s to the present day. The museum is set within a reconstructed historic village, featuring a traditional public house, café, period-style sweetshop, and a tram depot. Many of the trams are fully operational and provide rides for visitors along a scenic route that runs through the village and into the surrounding countryside.

The museum is operated by the Tramway Museum Society, a registered charity which receives no funding from local or central government and relies on admission charges and donations. Over the years, the museum has also been known as the Crich Tramway Museum and the Crich Tramway Village, but in early 2026 it announced that it was reverting to the National Tramway Museum name.

== History ==
=== Site history ===
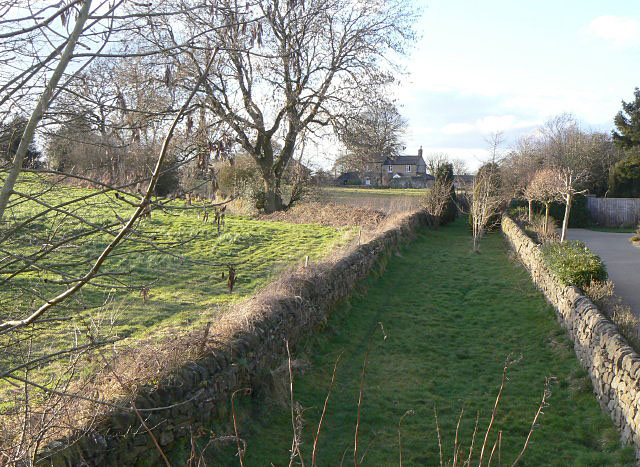
The alignment of Stephenson's mineral railway, looking towards the museum from about 200 metres (660 ft) away in 2009

George Stephenson, the great railway pioneer, had a close connection with Crich and the present (2008) tramway follows part of the mineral railway he built to link the quarry with Ambergate.

While building the North Midland Railway from Derby to Rotherham and Leeds, Stephenson had found rich coal seams in the Clay Cross area and he saw a new business opportunity. Crich was already well known for the quality of the limestone and Stephenson recognised that he could use the local coal and limestone to produce burnt lime for agricultural purposes, and then use the new railway to distribute it. Cliff Quarry, where the museum is now located, was acquired by Stephenson's company and to link the quarry with lime kilns he had built at Ambergate, Stephenson constructed a 1,000 mm (3 ft 3 3/8 in) gauge line – apparently the first metre-gauge railway in the world. Stephenson lived the last 10 years of his life in Chesterfield, often bringing visitors to Crich to see the mineral railway. He died in 1848 and is buried at Holy Trinity Church, Chesterfield.

Cliff Quarry remained in use until it closed in 1957/8, and shortly afterwards part of it was acquired for use by the museum. Other parts of the quarry, now known as Crich Quarry, reopened in the 1960s and was then operated by RMC and Tarmac. In 2000 ownership of the active quarry site was transferred to Bardon Aggregates, who closed the quarry in 2010. It remains closed.

=== Tramway Museum Society ===
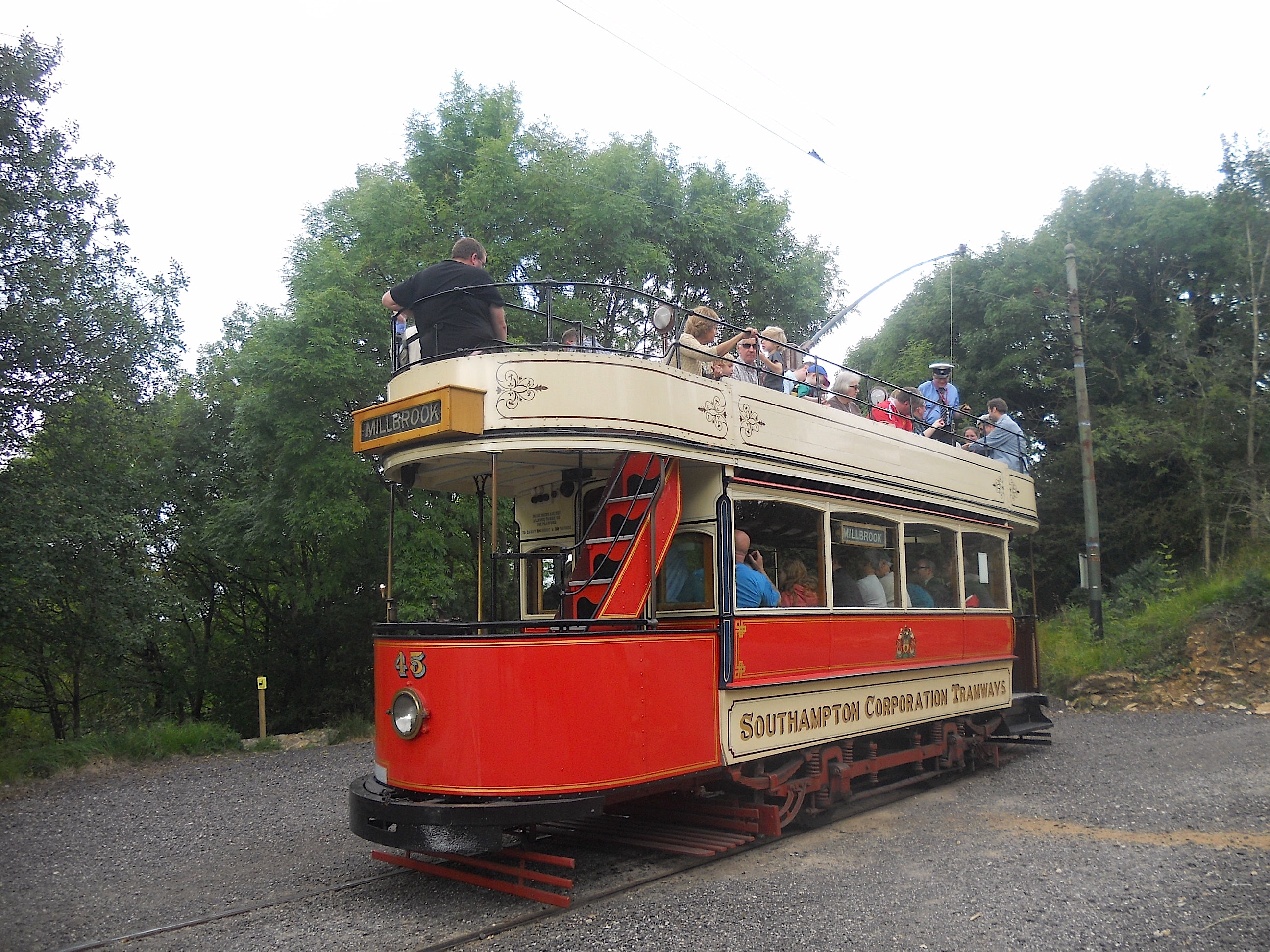
Southampton 45 was the first acquisition for the museum, in 1948 (taken in 2014)

In the period after the Second World War, when most of the remaining British tramways were in decline or actually closing, the first event in the history of the National Tramway Museum took place. A group of enthusiasts on a farewell tour of Southampton Corporation Tramways in August 1948 decided to purchase one of the open top trams on which they had ridden. For the sum of £10 (equivalent to £300 in 2025) they purchased number 45 – now included in collection at the museum. From this purchase grew the idea of a working museum devoted to operating tramcars. From the original group developed the Tramway Museum Society, established in 1955, incorporated as a company limited by guarantee in 1962, and recognised as an educational charity in 1963.

=== Site acquisition ===
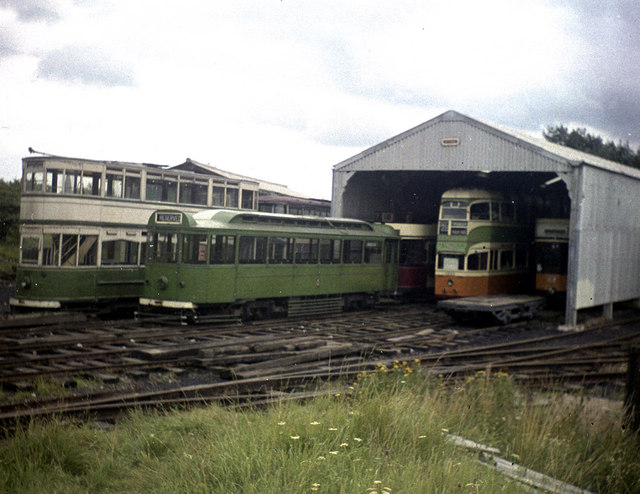
The depot in 1963, shortly after the site was acquired

After a sustained search across the country, in 1959 the society's attention was drawn to the then derelict limestone quarry at Crich in Derbyshire, from which members of the Talyllyn Railway Preservation Society were recovering track from Stephenson's mineral railway for their pioneering preservation project in Wales. After a tour of the quarry, members of the society agreed to lease – and later purchase – part of the site and buildings. Over the years, by the efforts of the society members, a representative collection of tramcars was brought together and restored, tramway equipment was acquired, a working tramway was constructed and depots and workshops were built. Recognising that tramcars did not operate in limestone quarries, the society agreed in 1967 to create around the tramway the kind of streetscape through which the trams had run and thus the concept of the Crich Tramway Village was born. Members then turned their attention to collecting items of street furniture and even complete buildings, which were then adapted to house the Museum's collections of books, photographs and archives.

=== Timeline ===
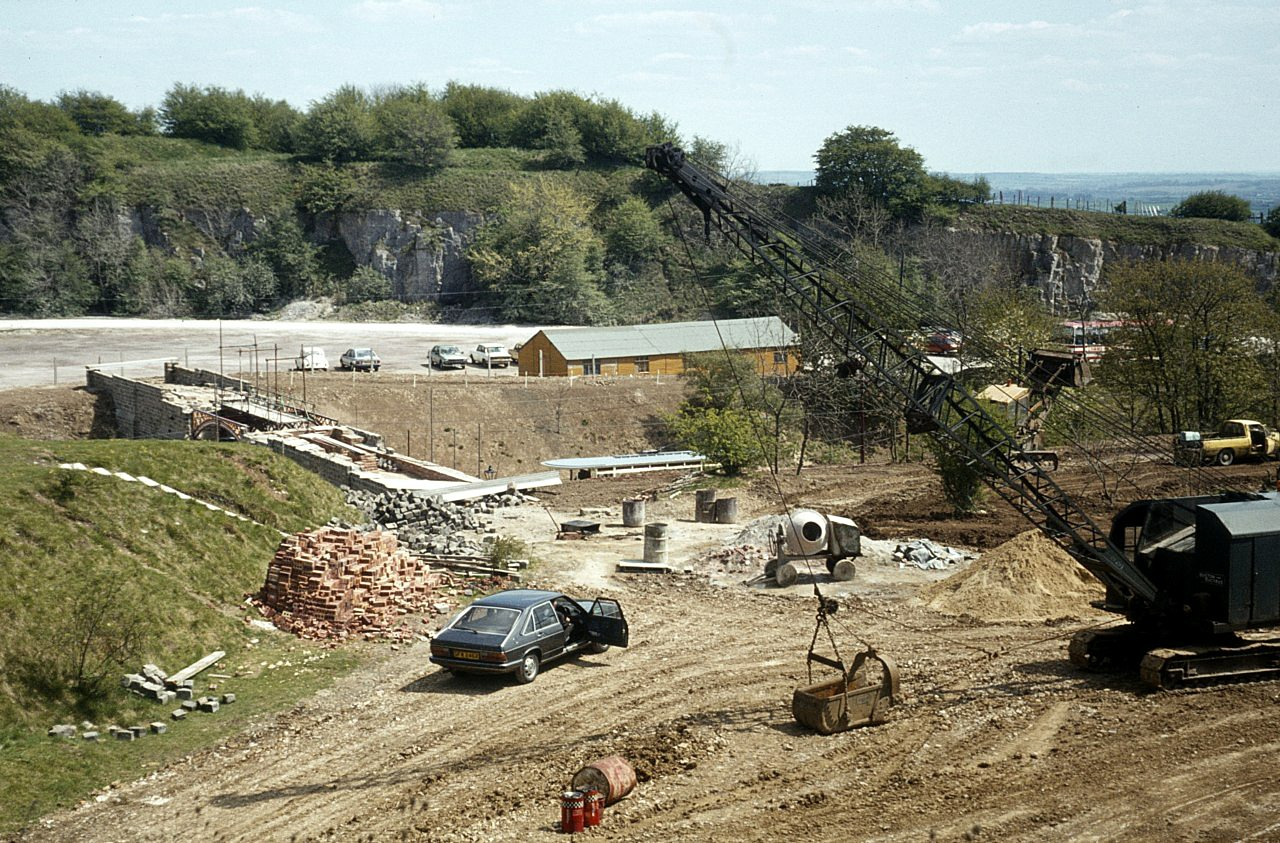
The Bowes-Lyon Bridge and Exhibition Hall under construction in 1984

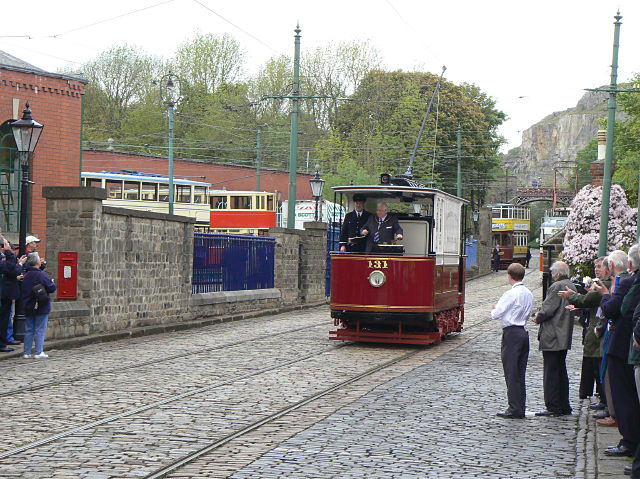
Celebrating 50 years of the museum in 2009

- 1963 – First horse tram service at what was then the Crich Tramway Museum
- 1964 – First electric tram service
- 1968 – The line was extended to Wakebridge, and the first Grand Transport Extravaganza held, in what was to become an annual event
- 1969 – Opening of purpose built workshops
- 1975 – The Duke of Gloucester become Patron of the Society
- 1976 – The re-erected facade of Derby Assembly Rooms was opened by the Duke of Gloucester.
- 1978 – Opening of scenic tramway to Glory Mine
- 1980 – The museum becomes the National Tramway Museum
- 1982 – First phase of museum library opened
- 1985 – Museum loans trams to Blackpool for Electric Tram Centenary
- 1988 – Museum loans trams for Glasgow Garden Festival
- 1990 – Museum loans trams for Gateshead Garden Festival
- 1991 – Exhibition Hall inaugurated
- 1997 – First AccessTram for visitors with disabilities
- 2001 – The museum was rebranded as the Crich Tramway Village
- 2002 – Opening of Workshop Viewing Gallery and the Red Lion pub
- 2004 – Woodland Walk and Sculpture Trail inaugurated by the Dowager Duchess of Devonshire
- 2005 – The Tramway Museum Society celebrates its 50th anniversary
- 2009 – The museum celebrates its 50th anniversary
- 2010 – The museum became an accredited museum; opening of new "Century of Trams" exhibition in main Exhibition Hall
- 2011 – Opening of refurbished George Stephenson Workshop
- 2014 – Passengers able to alight at Glory Mine for the first time
- 2020 – The museum remained closed for most of the year due to the COVID-19 pandemic
- 2025 – Opening of a new café adjacent to the Red Lion pub
- 2026 – The museum reverts to using the name National Tramway Museum

== Site ==
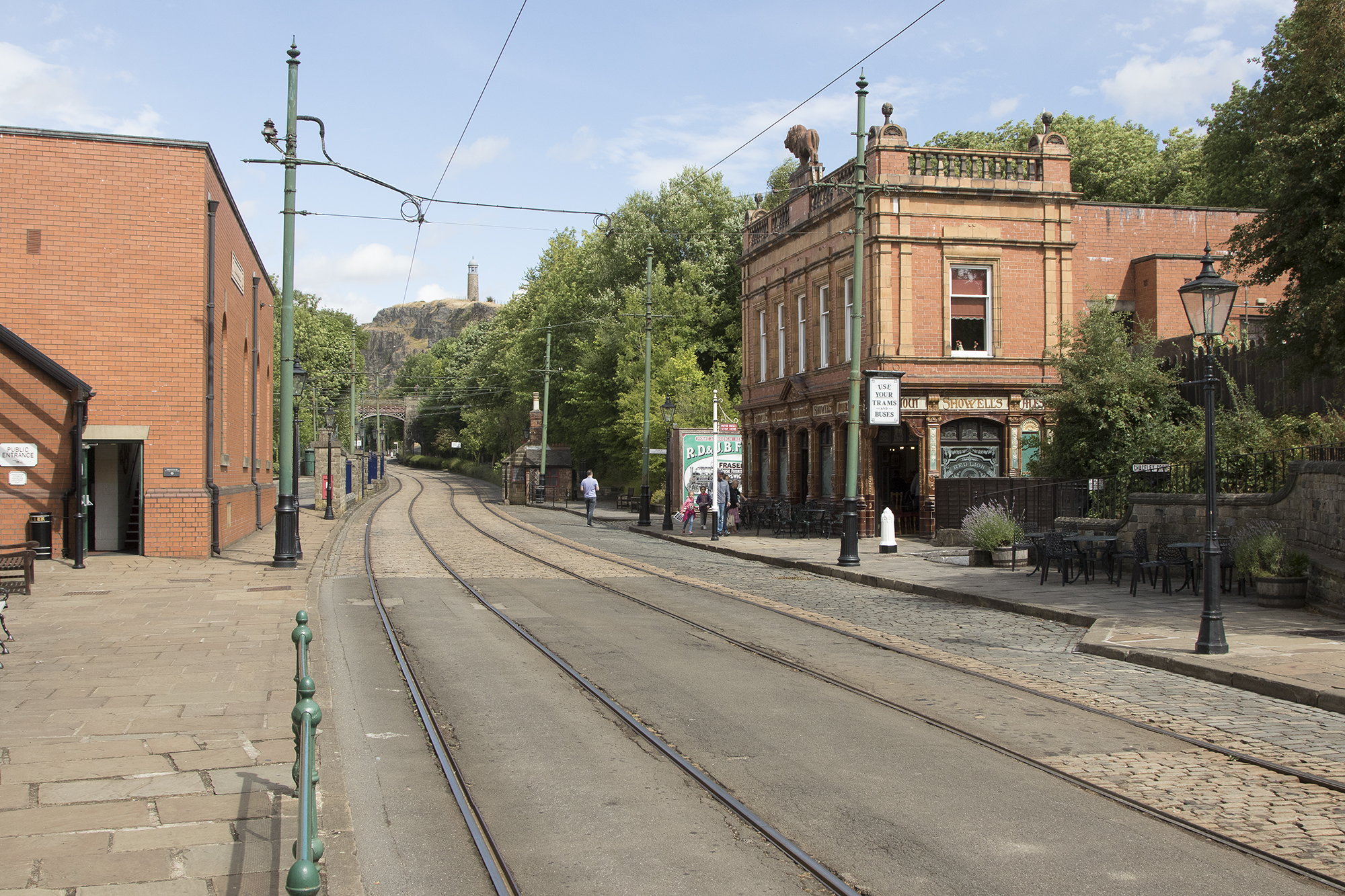
Part of the Period Street, with the Red Lion pub to the right, depot to left, and the Bowes-Lyon Bridge in the background in 2018

The museum site is made up of a number of different areas, with the museum's tramway passing either through or adjacent to all of them. The museum's main entrance delivers visitors to the Victoria Park area, but the trams start their journey at Town End, a walk or short tram ride under the Bowes-Lyon Bridge and down Period Street.

=== Period Street ===
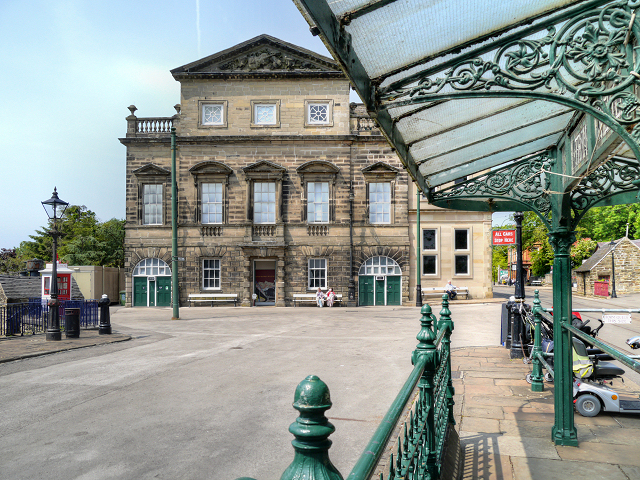
The Derby Assembly Rooms facade seen from the Town End tram stop shelter in 2013

The running line of the tramway starts from a stub terminus at Town End where outbound trams board passengers, having first disembarked inbound passengers at Stephenson Place. The first 500 metres (1,600 ft) of line is double track, laid in a setted street, and this is known as the Period Street. It has broad footpaths on both sides and is flanked by a number of old buildings and street furniture elements. The street scene is closed off by the Bowes-Lyon Bridge, which the tramway passes under.

Amongst the buildings and furniture in the street are:

- the Grade II listed 1763 facade of the Derby Assembly Rooms, moved to the site in 1975–1976. The modern building behind this facade houses a number of small exhibitions and the Tramway Museum Society's library.
- the original workshop of Stephenson's railway, now housing the Stephenson Discovery Centre.
- the Red Lion pub, relocated brick by brick from Church Street, Stoke-on-Trent (having to make way for the A500) and still serving its original purpose, together with the museum's café.
- a cast iron and glass tram shelter, thought to originate in Birmingham, at the Town End tram stop
- a Bundy clock, originally used in West Bromwich to regulate departure times of trams from termini.
- a cast iron urinal, originally located at the Erleigh Road terminus of Reading Corporation Tramways.
- a police box dating from the 1930s and a police call post dating from the 1920s. Both were formerly used by the London's Metropolitan Police and are grade II listed.
- a Penfold pillar box, dating from 1872 to 1879, and a K1 red telephone box, dating from 1921. Both were used by the Post Office and are grade II listed.

=== Stephenson Workshop and Discovery Centre ===
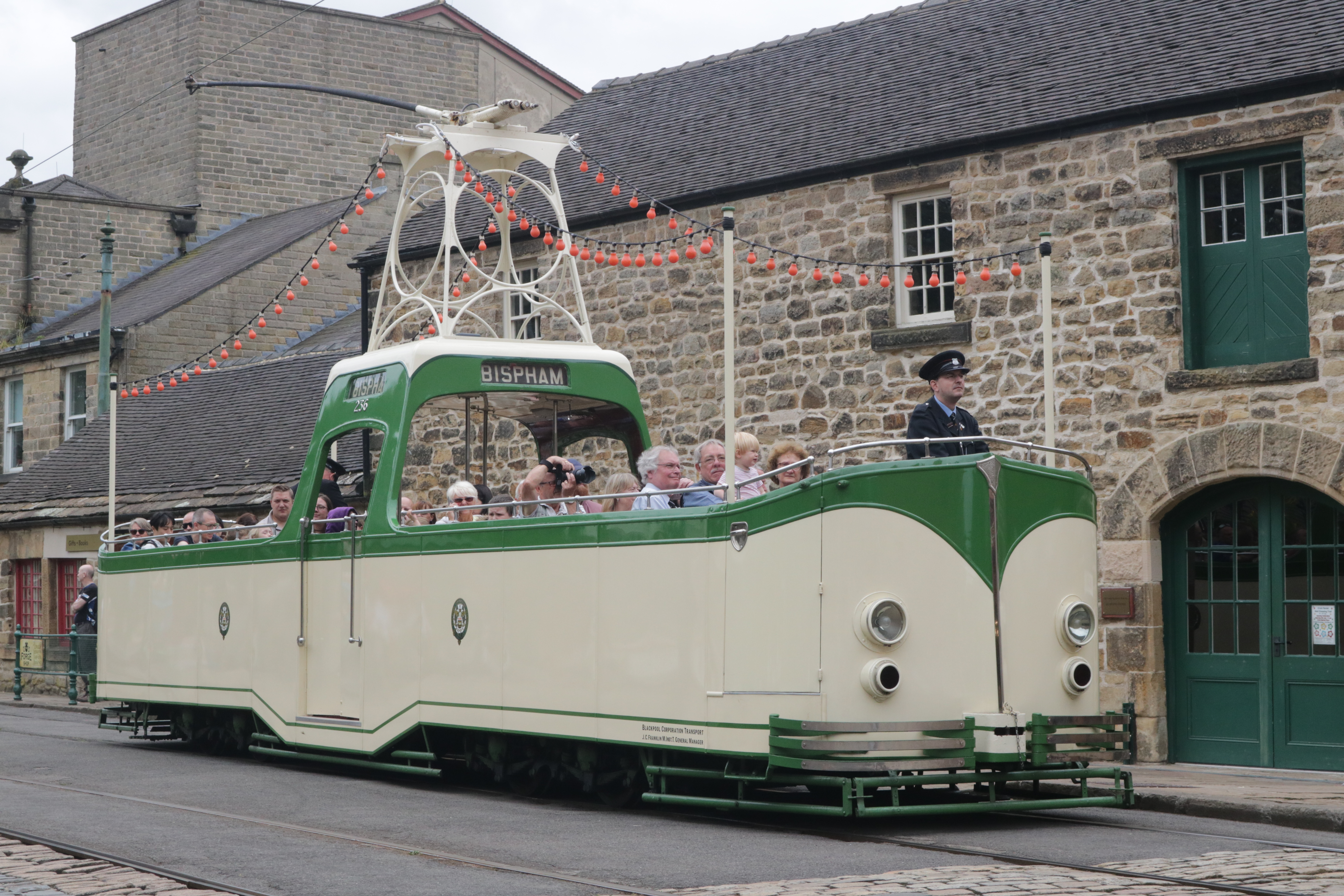
Blackpool 'boat' tram in front of the George Stephenson Centre in 2019

One of the few original buildings on the site that predate the creation of the museum, the Stephenson Workshop was built in the 19th century and was used as a smithy and wagon works for George Stephenson's metre-gauge mineral railway. Originally known as the Stone Workshop, the building has been fully restored and is now home to a state of the art learning facility on the ground floor and the Stephenson Discovery Centre on the first floor.

The Stephenson Discovery Centre explains the early history of the museum site, including the story of George Stephenson and his acquisition of Cliff Quarry and construction of the mineral railway. It also describes how overcrowding in expanding towns and cities paved the way for in the introductions of trams to Britain in the 19th century. A modern glass bridge from the upper floor provides access to the viewing gallery of the tram workshop (see below).

=== Tram Depot and Exhibition Hall ===
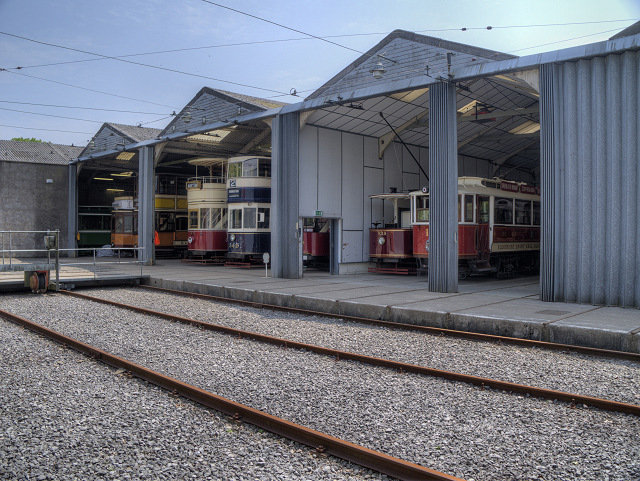
Tram depot and traverser in 2013

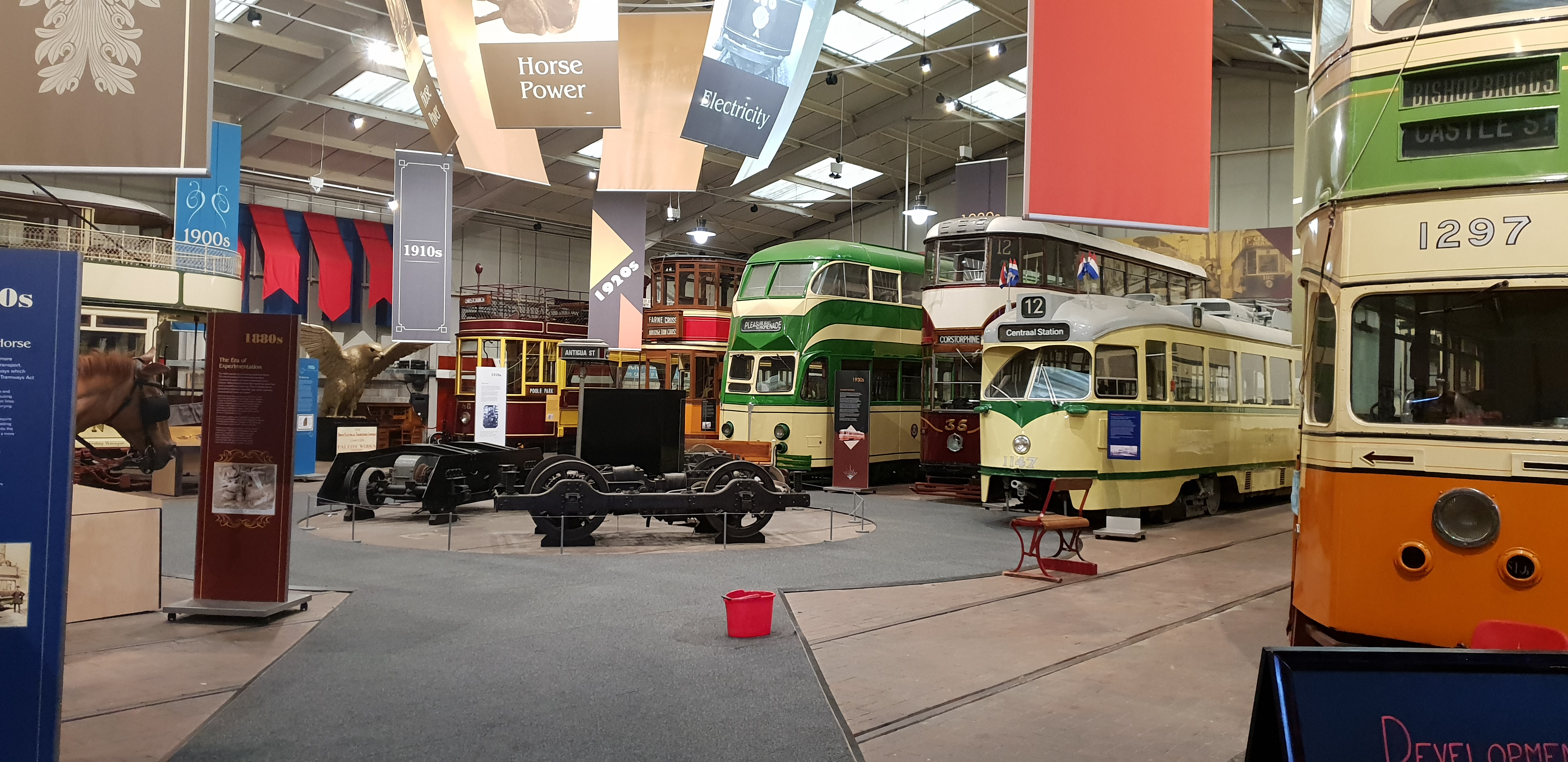
Exhibits in the Exhibition Hall in 2018

The tram depot is situated at the further end of the museum's Period Street, just before it passes under the Bowes-Lyon Bridge. The tram depot houses most of the museum's fleet of trams, including the running fleet when not in operation, other than those displayed in the exhibition hall, which faces the depot across the depot yard. The depot has 18 tracks, with each track able to accommodate several trams. The first 10 tracks are directly accessible from the depot yard, while tracks 11 to 18 are accessed via a traverser, which also provides rail access to the exhibition hall.

The tram depot includes a workshop, on tracks 1 to 3, used for the maintenance of the tram fleet. This has a viewing gallery, accessed by a glass bridge from the upper floor of the Stephenson Discovery Centre, which allows visitors to watch the work going on below and displays small exhibits relating to this work.

The exhibition hall presents the 'Century of Trams' exhibition, telling the story of a hundred years of tramway development, from 1860–1960, taking in horse trams, steam trams and electric trams. The story is told through the display of number of the museum's tram cars, together with interpretive panels, audio sounds to represent each decade of the timeline, and interactive displays.

=== Bowes-Lyon Bridge and Victoria Park ===
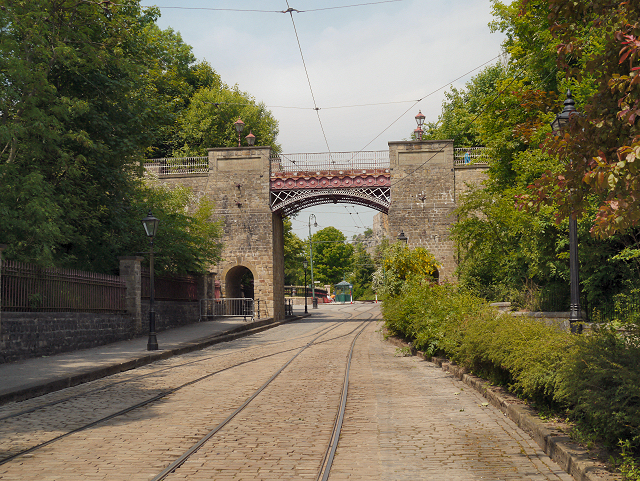
Bowes-Lyon Bridge with Victoria Park just visible through the arch in 2013

The Bowes-Lyon Bridge spans the end of the museum's period street, and provides both a vantage point and a visual closure to the recreated urban part of the museum. The bridge deck is constructed in cast iron and dates from 1844, when it was installed at the Bowes-Lyon Estate in St Paul's Walden, Hertfordshire. The bridge was donated to the museum in 1971, and subsequently re-erected at its present site. Embedded in the deck of the Bowes-Lyon Bridge is a stretch of horse-tram track, demonstrating the lightweight nature of such track when compared to that used by the electric trams on the lower level.

Immediately to the north and west of the bridge is Victoria Park, a recreated Victorian era public park. This has, as its centrepiece, a bandstand that was erected here in 1978 but was previously at Longford Park in Stretford, Greater Manchester. From the park, a path leads to the museum's Woodland Walk and Sculpture Trail. Alongside the park is a tram stop, served by both inbound and outbound trams and named after the park. To the east of the park, on the opposite side of the tramway, is the museum entrance.

=== Wakebridge and Glory Mine ===
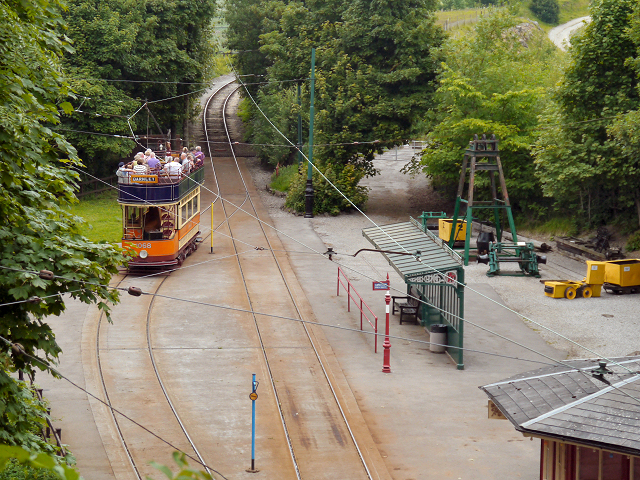
Wakebridge tram stop and passing loop looking towards Glory Mine in 2013

Just past the Victoria Park tram stop, the museum's running track transitions from grooved tram track set in a road surface to sleeper track and becomes single track. The line passes between woodland to the west and the now disused Cliff Quarry to the east, before arriving at the Wakebridge passing loop and tram stop.

The stop has a selection of shelters and simple buildings, including the Birmingham Tram Shelter, the Bradford Cabmans Shelter, and the Octogon, together with the line's electrical sub-station. A path leads to the museum's Woodland Walk and Sculpture Trail. Adjacent to the stop, the Peak District Mines Historical Society has created an exhibition of mining equipment, including the mouth of a drift mine with a battery powered locomotive coming out of it, and a shop selling mineral samples, books and gemstones.

Beyond Wakebridge, the line runs along an exposed hillside with vistas across the valley of the River Derwent, which is here part of the World Heritage Site, the Derwent Valley Mills. While now largely rural, this valley was one of the cradles of the Industrial Revolution, where the modern factory system was introduced during the 18th century to take advantage of Richard Arkwright's invention of the water frame for spinning cotton.

At the end of the line is the Glory Mine tram stop and passing loop. A public footpath crosses the line, giving access to Crich Stand.

=== Woodland Walk and Sculpture Trail ===
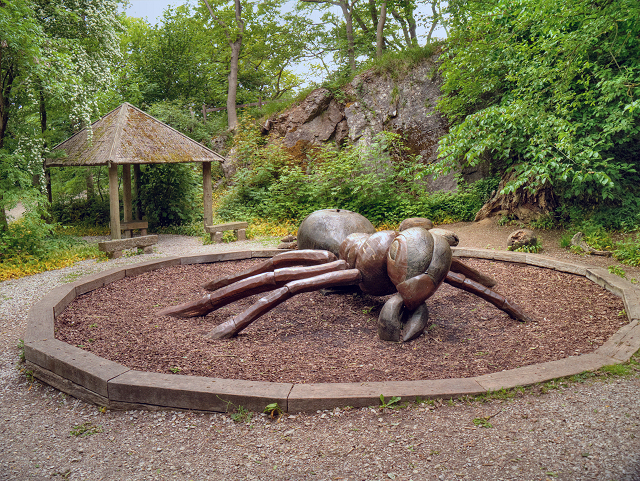
Giant wooden ant on the sculpture trail in 2013

The Woodland Walk and Sculpture trail connects the tram stops at Victoria Park and Wakebridge, passing through the mixed woodland that is native to the limestone geology of the Crich area. Tree cover is mostly ash, but also includes sycamore, alder and silver birch, with a shrub layer of hazel, wych elm, wild rose, elder and hawthorn. The combination of the ash canopy and limestone results in a range of ground-cover plants including primrose, early purple orchid, cowslip, marjoram, garlic and strawberries.

Most of the sculptures along the trail were carved by the sculptor, Andy Frost, using a chainsaw and carving a basic shape from a tree trunk before working on the detail. Such sculptures do not last forever, with wood splitting, fungi and the claws of badgers all contributing to their deterioration. The sculpture trail is therefore always evolving, as old sculptures are removed and new ones added.

Also to be spotted in the Woodland Walk is a stretch of the original narrow-gauge track as used in the old quarry, and a labyrinth made from old stones left in the quarry. There are views down into the valley of the River Derwent and up to Crich Stand.

== Tramcar collection ==
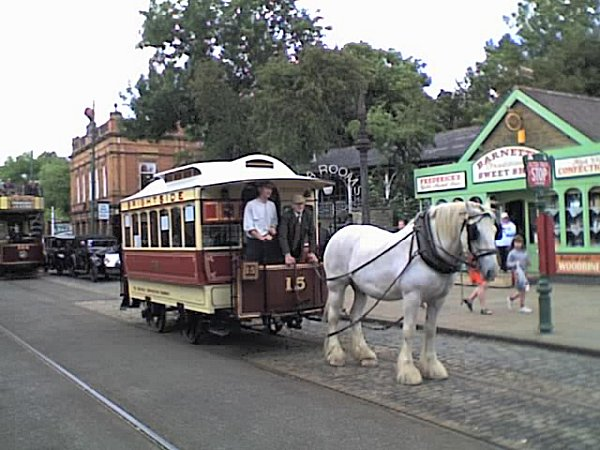
Sheffield 15 was the first tram to operate at the museum (taken 2006)

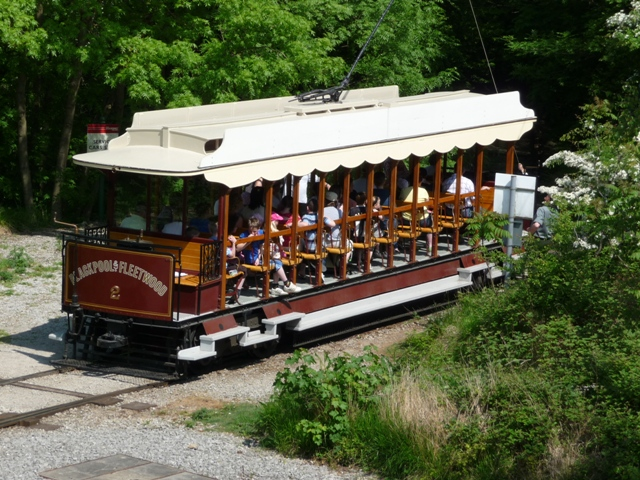
Blackpool and Fleetwood 2, the first electric tram to carry passengers at Crich (taken 2010)

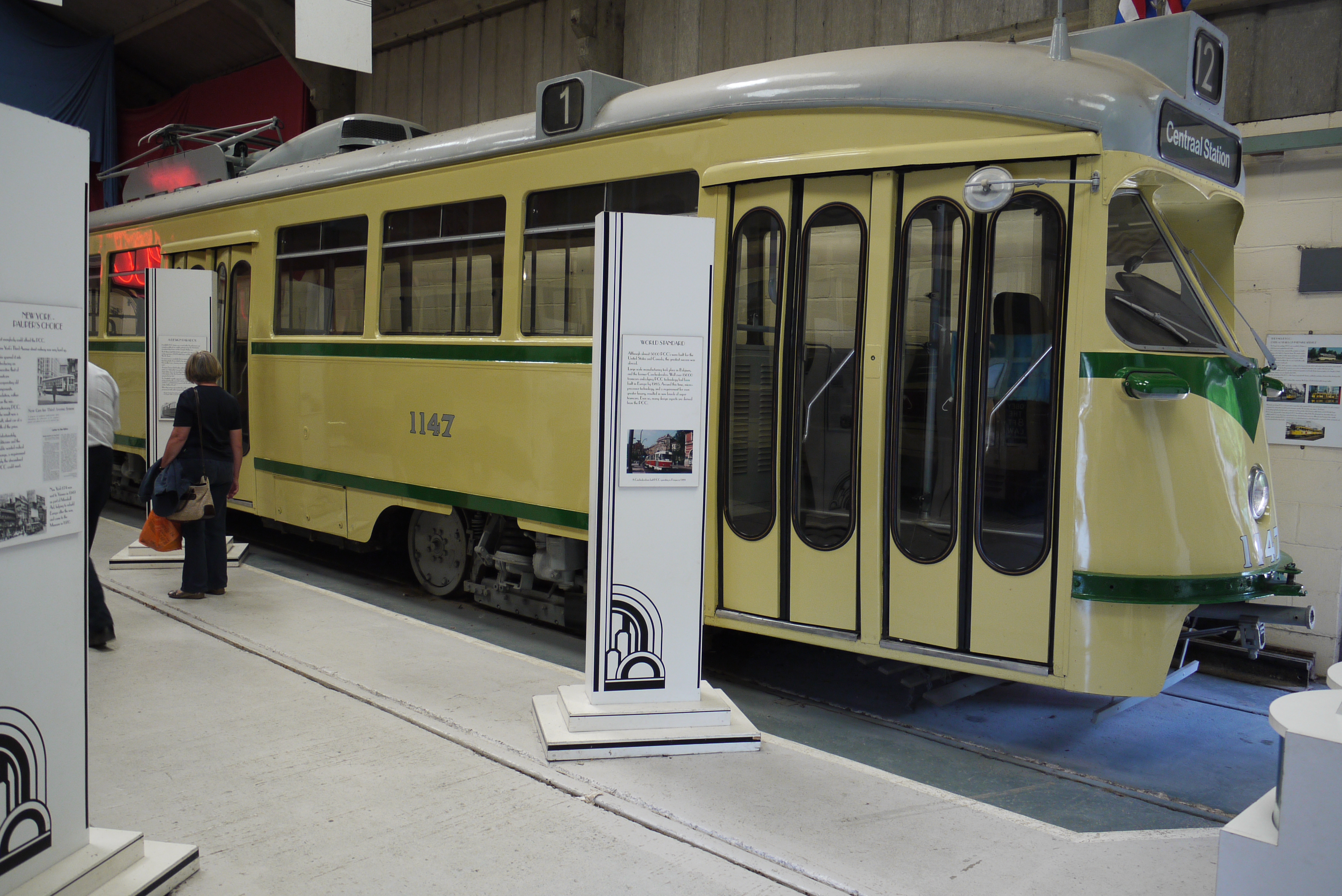
Den Haag 1147, built in 1957 to the classic US PCC design and an ancestor of cars to be seen on the UK's second generation tramways (taken 2009)

The museum has over 80 tramcars in its collection. The majority of these are electric double-decker trams built between 1900 and 1930 for use in a large selection of British towns and cities, but the collection also includes earlier horse and steam hauled trams, more modern trams, and trams built for a number of cities across the world.

Many of the cars are in operable condition, and are used on the museum's running line, whilst others are restored in static condition and are displayed in the museum's display hall or elsewhere on the site. A few are stored in unrestored condition, some of these being at the museum's off-site store at Clay Cross.

Among this fleet are:

- Southampton 45, built in 1903, was the very first tramcar to be preserved by the Tramway Museum Society, purchased for just £10 in 1949, after the closing ceremony of the Southampton Corporation.
- Sheffield 15, a horse-drawn tram dating from 1874, was the first tram to operate at the museum, in 1963 and before the electric overhead was erected. The car still operates on a few 'horse tram' days a year.
- Blackpool and Fleetwood 2, a single deck tram built in 1898, was the first electric tram to carry passengers at the museum, in 1964.
- Blackpool 4 is the oldest electric tram in the collection and built in 1885 for the opening of Britain's first electric street tramway. Stored, and then preserved, by Blackpool tramways, it has been in the care of the museum since 1973.
- London United Tramways 159, an electric tram built in 1902 to a particularly luxurious specification to serve London's affluent western suburbs, between Hampton Court, Hammersmith and Wimbledon.
- Chesterfield 7, an electric tram built in 1904, survived a depot fire which destroyed many other trams and was also used as a house after withdrawal. The museum found the tram and restored it.
- Metropolitan Electric Tramways 331, built in 1930 as a prototype for the fleet of Feltham cars that served London's northern suburbs until the 1950s.
- Glasgow 1282, a "Coronation" streamliner, built in 1940 and survived to run in the closing procession in 1962. Built to a very high specification and described as the finest short stage carriage vehicles in Europe.
- Sheffield 510, which entered service in 1950 and was withdrawn, still almost brand-new, when the city's tram system closed in 1960. Car 510 was specially decorated for the occasion as Sheffield's last tram, and still retains this decoration.
- Prague 180, built in 1908, was gifted to the museum during the Prague Spring of 1968 and transported to Crich days before the subsequent Operation Danube. It became a symbol of the plight of the country.
- Den Haag Tramways No. 1147, built in 1957 in Belgium for a Dutch tramway to the classic US PCC design. This car presages the modern tram cars that are to be seen around the world today, including on the UK's second generation tramways.

== Tramway ==
=== Running line ===
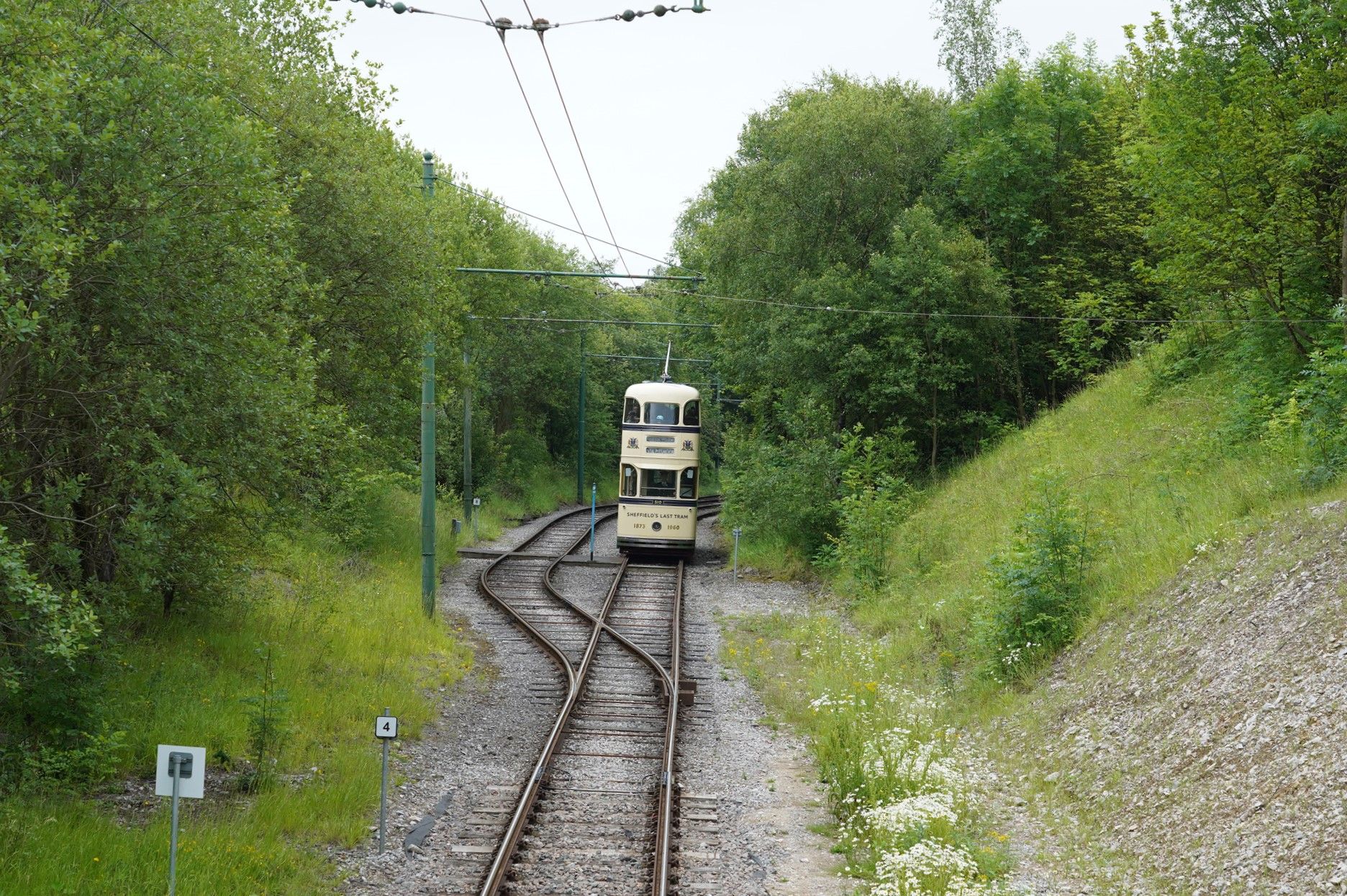
The end of the double track, seen from an inbound tram while Sheffield 510 waits to head outbound towards Wakebridge in 2019

The running line of the tramway is approximately 1.6 kilometres (0.99 mi) long. The line starts from a stub terminus at Town End where outbound trams board passengers, having first disembarked inbound passengers at Stephenson Place. From Town End, about the first 500 metres (1,600 ft) of line is double track, laid in a setted street, flanked by the buildings of the recreated period village, and including the inbound-only Stephenson Place tram stop. The street scene is closed off by the Bowes-Lyon Bridge, which the line crosses under on gauntlet track. Just before the bridge, a junction gives access to the depot and yard.

On the far side of the bridge the line returns to double track and calls at the Victoria Park tram stop, which serves both the recreated Victorian-era public park of the same name, and the main entrance to the site from the car park. The double track continues for another 240 metres (790 ft) before converging into single track that continues as far as the Wakebridge tram stop and passing loop, which is located some 1 kilometre (0.62 mi) from Town End. Beyond the passing loop, the track returns to single track as far as the Glory Mine tram stop and terminus, where there is a further passing loop and a headshunt, together with a siding.

=== Passenger services ===
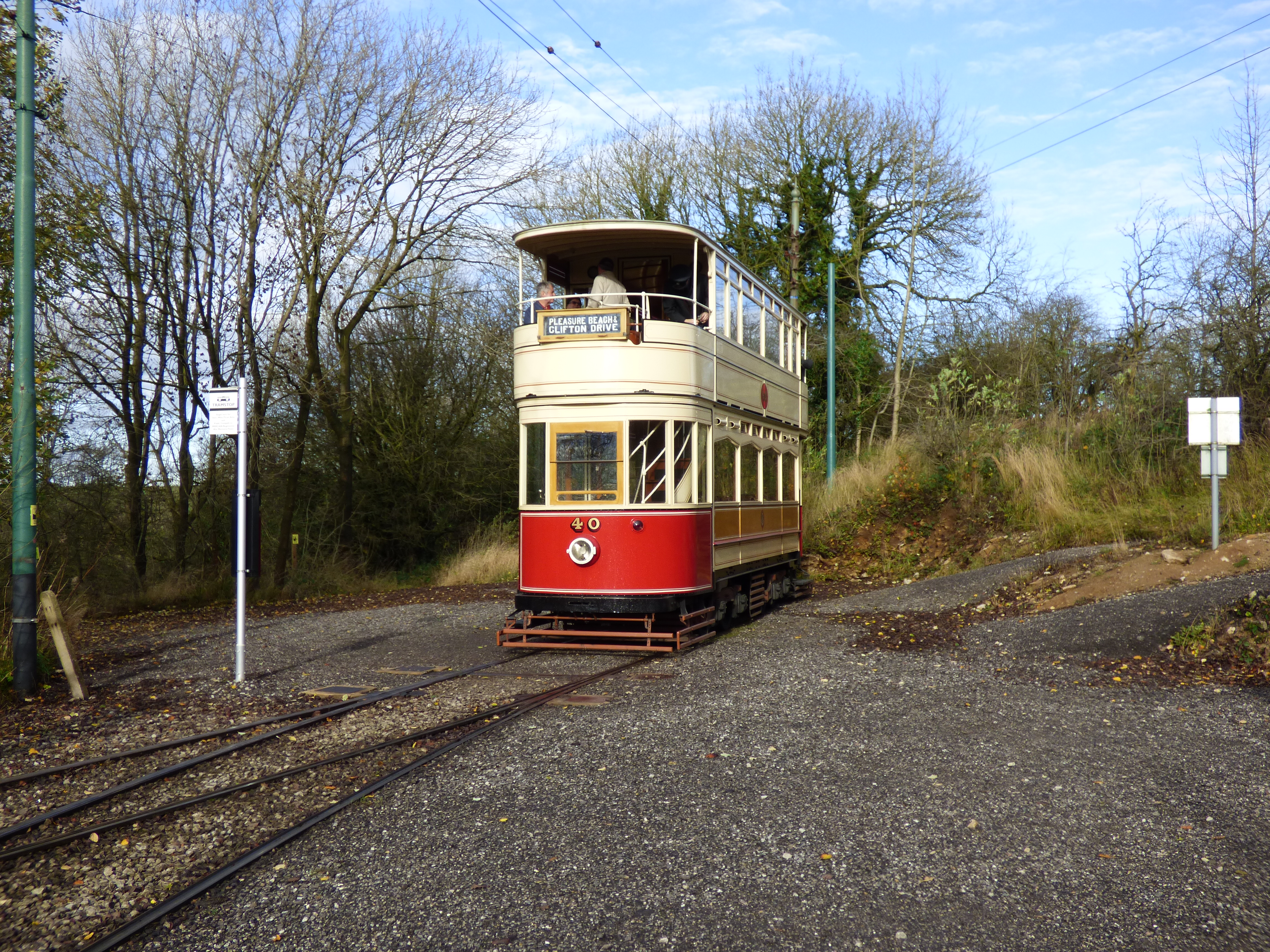
Blackpool Corporation 40 at the Glory Mine terminus in 2015

The tramway is generally operated whenever the museum is open. Depending on the time of year and level of demand, a two or three car service is normally provided. If a two car service is operated, trams pass on the double-track section in the street. If three trams are in service, trams pass both in the loop at Wakebridge and in the street.

On special occasions, up to 18 tramcars can be operated, with trams operating in convoys of two or three through the single track sections. The convoys pass each other on the street, at Wakebridge, and at Glory Mine terminus.

The tramway has a 1969 tram from Berlin, which was converted to allows visitors with disabilities to travel the line, with the provision of a wheelchair lift and wider doors. This tram is now out of use, and the museum is fundraising for a new access tram based on a 1987 tram from Blackpool.

=== Methods of current collection ===
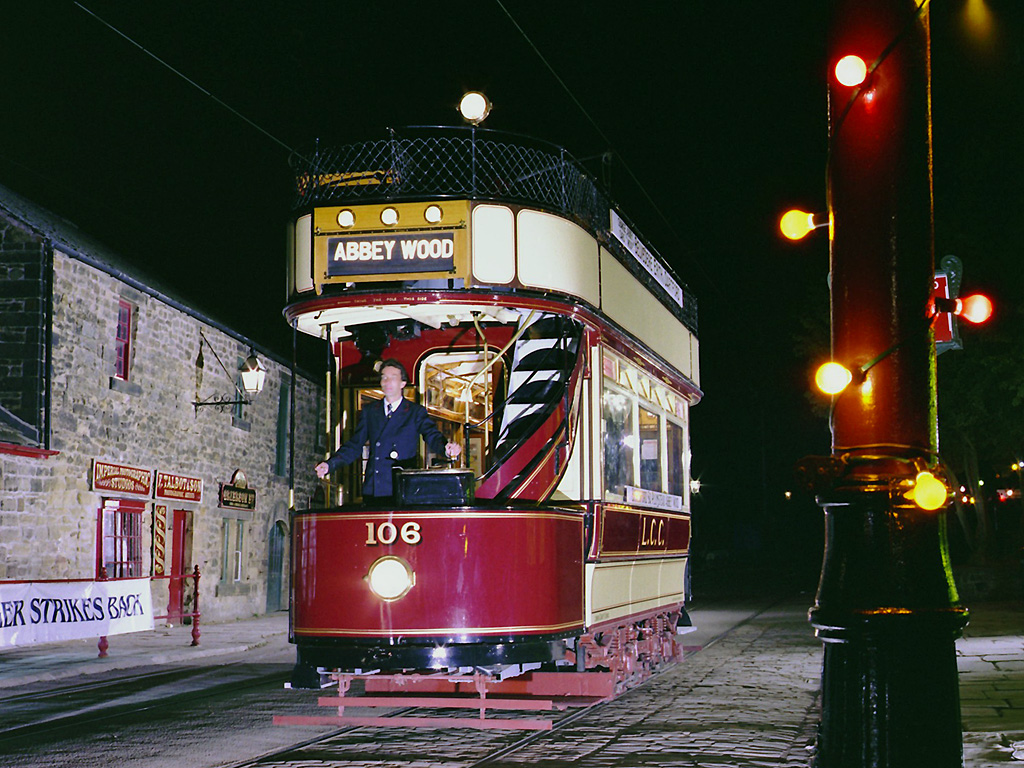
Night scene with an early electric tram in 1983

Most of the museum's trams are electric trams which were designed to be powered by an overhead wire system using one of, or a combination of, trolley poles, bow collectors or pantographs. The museum's overhead wire system has been built so that trams with any of those types of current collection can be used. The current is supplied at 600 volts DC.

Other forms of current collection were used by electric trams, especially in the early days of such tramways, and the museum has non-operational displays of several of them:

- Conductors set in steel troughs under the roadway, as used on the UK's first street running electric tramway at Blackpool, and represented in Crich by the display of Blackpool 4 in the Exhibition Hall.
- The stud contact system, as demonstrated with a dummy stud between the rails in the yard. This is the only known example of this form remaining, and is from Wolverhampton.

== Access ==
The museum is open from early March to early November. It is 18 kilometres (11 mi) north of Derby, 32 kilometres (20 mi) south of Sheffield, 66 kilometres (41 mi) south-east of Manchester, and 200 kilometres (120 mi) north-west of London. The nearest railway station is Whatstandwell

== In the media ==
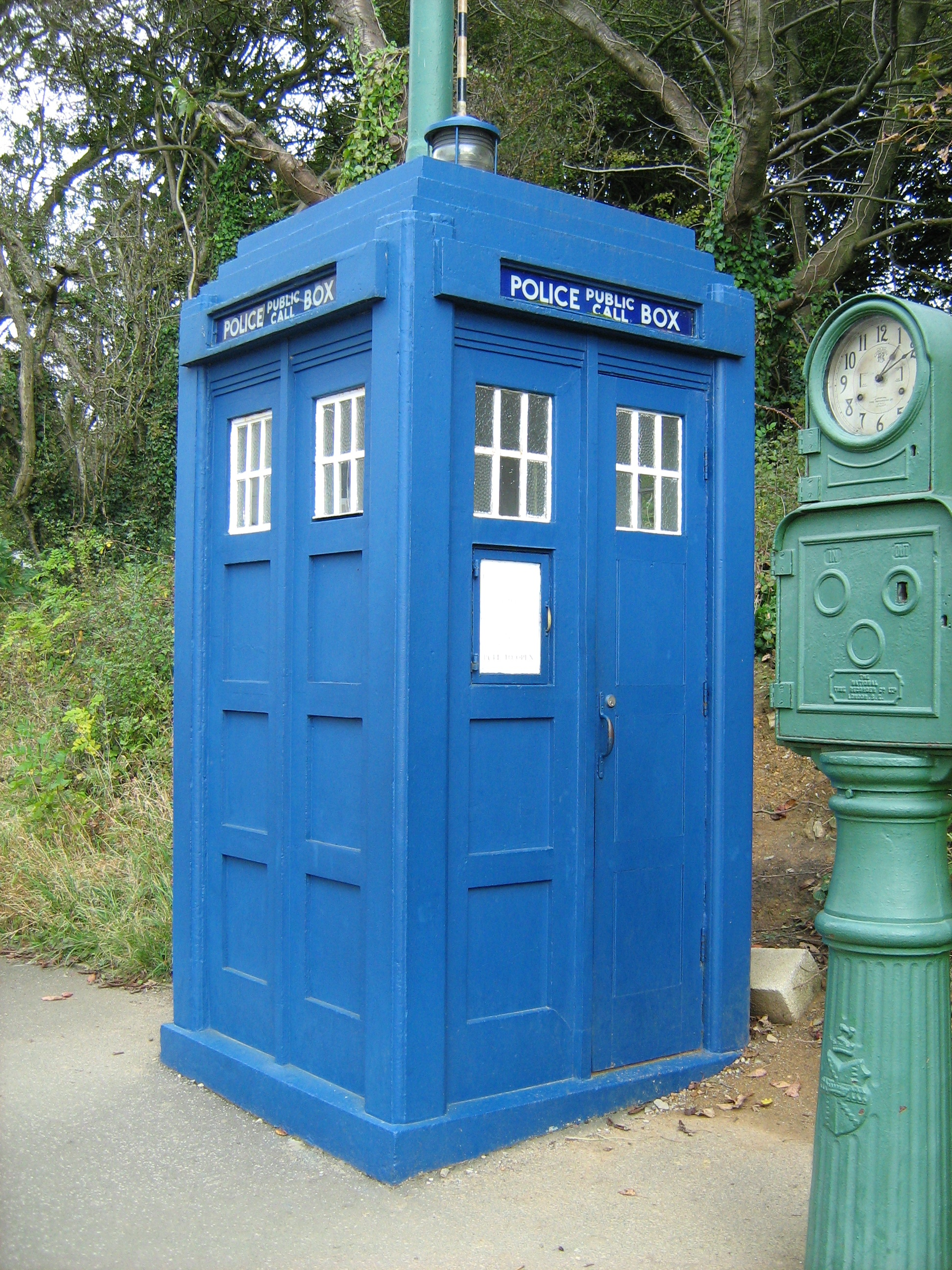
The police box on the Period Street in 2007

The museum featured in the opening scenes of the romantic drama film Women in Love (1969), directed by Ken Russell, and starring Alan Bates, Oliver Reed, Glenda Jackson, and Jennie Linden. It also served as one of the locations in the black comedy film Sightseers (2012).

In 2008 the museum, under its old name of Crich Tramway Museum, was featured in the lyrics of the John Shuttleworth song "Dandelion and Burdock".

Amongst the street furniture in the Period Street is a police box of the style made famous as the TARDIS in the science fiction television series Doctor Who (1963–1989; 2005–present).

== See also ==
- List of tramcars of the National Tramway Museum
- Listed buildings in Crich
- Beamish Museum, an open-air museum located in County Durham
- Light Rail Transit Association, a non-profit organisation whose purpose is to advocate and encourage research into the retention and development of light rail and tramway/streetcar systems
- Maley & Taunton, a former tram and tramway engineering company
- Scottish Tramway and Transport Society, the first society in the United Kingdom dedicated to tramway retention and preservation
- Summerlee Museum of Scottish Industrial Life, an industrial and social history museum in Coatbridge, North Lanarkshire, Scotland
- The Trolleybus Museum at Sandtoft, a transport museum which specialises in the preservation of trolleybuses in Lincolnshire
- Wirral Tramway, a heritage tramway in Birkenhead
