= James Frost (disambiguation) =

James Frost may refer to:

- James Frost (cement maker) (c. 1780–c. 1840), British manufacturer
- James Frost (video director) (born 1973), English video director
- James Frost (born 1986), Welsh musician
- James A. Frost (1918–2017), American historian
- James Bernard Frost, American author
- James Marion Frost (1848–1916), American Baptist preacher

== See also ==
- Jack Frost (disambiguation)
