= Andy Frost =

Andy Frost may refer to:

- Andy Frost (autosports) (born 1961), English-born automotive mechanic and drag racer
- Andy Frost (hammer thrower), British athlete
- Andy Frost (radio personality) (born 1956), Toronto radio personality
- Andy Frost (rugby union) (born 1983), English rugby union player
- Andy Frost (sculptor) (born 1957), English sculptor

== See also ==
- Andrew Frost (disambiguation)
