= Edgar O'Ballance =

Irish-born military writer and commentator

Major Edgar "Paddy" O'Ballance (17 July 1918, Dublin, Ireland – 8 July 2009, Wakebridge, Derbyshire, England) was an Irish-born British military journalist, researcher, defence commentator and academic lecturer specialising in international relations and defence problems.

== Life ==
He was emergency commissioned a Second Lieutenant from Sergeant in the Sherwood Foresters on 19 January 1941. As a temporary Major he was mentioned in dispatches for service in Palestine between 27 March and 30 June 1948.

He served in the British army until 1948.

In April 1953 he was commissioned into the Territorial Army as a captain, serving with the Sherwood Foresters. He was promoted major in March 1955. In June 1963 he transferred from the Sherwood Foresters to the General List. In July 1965 he was awarded the Territorial Efficiency Decoration.

In 1968 he transferred from the General List (Territorial Army) to the General List (Regular Army Reserve of Officers) and having achieved the age limit on 17 July 1968 (his 50th birthday) retired retaining the rank of major.

He worked as a journalist for a US Wire Agency from 1948 to 1962, and was thereafter a freelance journalist. He covered over twenty wars and insurgencies and wrote extensively on international relations, defence and strategic problems. He was a member of the International Institute for Strategic Studies and Chairman of the London-based Military Commentators' Circle. He wrote many articles for military journals and was the author of over forty books.

== Mad dog of the Middle East ==
O'Ballance was the originator of the phrase "mad dog of the Middle East" when referring to Muammar al-Gaddafi while on the lecture circuit in the USA. The then-U.S. president, Ronald Reagan, picked it up and used the phrase himself in April 1986.

== Books ==
- No Victor, No Vanquished: the Yom Kippur War ISBN 0-89141-017-1
- Malaya: The Communist insurgent war, 1948–1960
- The Arab-Israeli War 1948
- The Sinai Campaign, 1956
- The Red Army
- The Red Army of China
- The Story of the French Foreign Legion
- The Indo-China War, 1945–54
- The Greek Civil War, 1944–1949 – 1966
- The Algerian Insurrection 1954–1962 – 1967
- Korea: 1950–1953 – 1969 ISBN 0-89874-885-2
- The War in Yemen – 1971
- The Third Arab-Israeli war – 1972
- The Kurdish Revolt: 1961–1970 – 1973
- Arab guerilla power, 1967–1972 – 1974
- The Electronic War in the Middle East, 1968–70 – 1974
- The secret war in the Sudan, 1955–1972 – 1977
- Language of Violence: The blood politics of terrorism – 1979
- The Wars in Vietnam – 1981
- The US rapid deployment force – 1981
- Terror in Ireland: The Heritage of Hate – 1984
- The Gulf War – 1988
- Civil War in Bosnia, 1992–94 – 1995. ISBN 0-312-12503-8
- Wars in the Caucasus, 1990–1995 – 1997. ISBN 0814761925
- The Palestinian Intifada 1998
- Civil War in Lebanon, 1975–92 – 1998. ISBN 0-312-21593-2
- The Congo-Zaire experience, 1960–98 – 2000. ISBN 0-312-22795-7
- Afghan Wars: 1839 To the Present Day – 2002. ISBN 1-85753-308-9
- The cyanide war : Tamil insurrection in Sri Lanka, 1973–88. London: Brassey's (UK). ISBN 978-0-08-036695-1

== See also ==
- Black July
- Lebanese Civil War
