= John Frost =

John Frost may refer to:

- John Frost (aviator), member of Early Birds of Aviation
- John Frost (British Army officer) (1912–1993), British army officer, served in Operation Market Garden
  - John Frost Bridge, Arnhem, named after the army officer
- John Frost (Chartist) (1784–1877), Welsh Chartist
  - John Frost Square, Newport, named after the Chartist
- John Frost (cricketer) (1847–1916), English cricketer
- John Frost (footballer) (born 1980), Irish footballer
- John Frost (minister) (1716–1779), first ordained Protestant minister in present-day Canada
- Sir John Frost (physician) (1803–1840), founder of the Medico-Botanical Society of London, concerning the medical application of plants
- Sir John Frost (1828–1918), Anglo-South African cabinet minister and landowner
- John Frost (producer) (born 1952), Australian theatre producer
- John Frost (republican) (1750–1842), English radical and secretary of the London Corresponding Society
- John Frost (SAAF officer) (1918–1942), highest scoring air ace with a South African Air Force unit
- John Carver Meadows Frost (1915–1979), British aircraft designer for the Avro Aircraft Company amongst others
- John K. Frost (1922–1990), cytopathologist at Johns Hopkins Hospital
- John W. Frost (born 1934), American tennis player of the 1950s and 1960s

== See also ==
- John Frost Nugent, Democratic senator from Idaho
- Jack Frost (disambiguation)
