= Andrew Frost =

Andrew Frost may refer to:

- Andrew Frost (arts writer); see The Art Life
- Andrew Frost (hammer thrower), English hammer thrower
- Andrew Frost (sculptor) (born 1957), English sculptor
- Andrew Frost (rugby union) (born 1983), English rugby union player
- Andrew Frost, singer with The Magnets
- Andrew Frost, character in The Final Deduction

== See also ==
- Andy Frost (disambiguation)
