= Michael Frost =

Michael Frost may refer to:

- Michael Frost (minister) (born 1961), Australian missiologist and author
- Michael Frost (footballer) (born 1970), former Australian rules footballer
- Michael Frost, bass player for the Israeli alternative rock group Metropolin
- Mike Frost (cricketer), Irish cricketer

== See also ==
- Frost (surname)
