= Jack Frost (comics) =

Jack Frost, in comics, may refer to:

- Jack Frost (Fables), a character in Fables and Jack of Fables
- Jack Frost (manhwa), a manhwa series by Go Jin-ho
- Jack Frost (Marvel Comics), two Marvel Comics characters
- Jack Frost (Vertigo), a character in Grant Morrison's The Invisibles
- Little Jack Frost, an Avon Comics title

== See also ==
- Jack Frost (disambiguation)
