= Jack Frost (disambiguation) =

Jack Frost is the character from English folklore who personifies winter.

Jack Frost may also refer to:

== People ==
- Jack Frost (footballer, born 1870) (1870–1935), Australian footballer
- Jack Frost (footballer, born 1920) (1920–1988), English professional footballer
- Jack Frost (footballer, born 1992), Australian footballer
- Jack Frost (musician) (born 1968), American guitarist
- Jack Frost (politician) (1911–1995), Australian politician
- John Frost (SAAF officer) (1918–1942), South African fighter ace
- John Carver Meadows Frost (1915–1979), aka Jack Frost, British aircraft designer for Avro Canada
- John W. Frost (born 1934), American academic and former tennis player
- Jack Frost, pseudonym of Bob Dylan (born 1941) as producer starting in the 1990s
- Jumpin Jack Frost, DJ name of drum and bass DJ Nigel Thompson

== Bands ==
- Jack Frost (Australian band), Australian rock band
- Jack Frost (Austrian band), Austrian gothic band

== Arts and entertainment ==
- Jack Frost (1934 film), an animated short film produced by Ub Iwerks
- Jack Frost (1964 film), Russian film
- Jack Frost (TV special), a 1979 Rankin-Bass television special
- Jack Frost (1997 film), a 1997 horror film
  - Jack Frost 2: Revenge of the Mutant Killer Snowman, the 2000 sequel to the above horror film
- Jack Frost (1998 film), a family film starring Michael Keaton
- Jack Frost (manhwa), a 2009 manhwa series by Go Jin Ho
- Jack Frost, an album from Australian band Jack Frost

== Fictional characters ==
- Jack Frost (comics)
  - Jack Frost (Marvel Comics), pair of characters
  - Jack Frost, a character in the Vertigo Comics series The Invisibles
  - Jack Frost (Fables), a character in Jack of Fables
  - Jack Frost, an Avon Comics character based on the folkloric figure
- Jack Frost (detective), central character in radio plays and novels by R.D. Wingfield and TV series A Touch of Frost
- Jack Frost (mascot), the unofficial mascot of Atlus, a Japanese computer and video game company
- Jack Frost, a minor character in the StarCraft expansion Insurrection
- Jack Frost, a character played by Martin Short in The Santa Clause 3: The Escape Clause
- Jack Frost, a character from the film Rise of the Guardians and the William Joyce book series on which it was based
- Jack Frost, the antagonist in Neil Gaiman's The Graveyard Book
- Jack Frost, antagonist of the Rainbow Magic book series

== Other uses ==
- Jack Frost Ski Resort, in the Poconos region of Pennsylvania, United States

== See also ==
- Frost (surname)
- John Frost (disambiguation)
