= Robert Frost (disambiguation) =

Robert Frost (1874–1963) was an American poet.

Robert Frost may also refer to:

- Robert Frost (pioneer), one of the dead in the Fort Parker massacre
- Robert I. Frost (born c. 1960), British historian
- Robert S. Frost (1942–2013), American composer and music educator
- Rob Frost (1950–2007), English Christian evangelist, broadcaster and author

== See also ==
- Robert Frost Middle School (disambiguation)
