= William Frost (disambiguation) =

William Frost was a Welsh aviator.

William Frost may also refer to:

- William Frost (MP) (died c. 1408), MP for City of York
- William Edward Frost, English painter
- William Goodell Frost, Greek scholar and president of Berea College
- Jack Frost (detective) (William Edward Frost), fictional character in A Touch of Frost
