= Polly Frost =

American writer, journalist and playwright

Polly Frost is a New York City-based writer, journalist, and playwright specializing in humor and erotic horror. Frost's current work can be seen performed by various NYC-based actors at the Cornelia Street Cafe. During her early journalistic days, Frost interviewed a variety of people, including Julia Child, Pauline Kael, and Winona Ryder.

== Career ==
Frost has been a freelance writer for over 30 years. Her work has appeared in The New Yorker, The Atlantic, The New York Times, Scene4 Magazine, Identity Theory, Exquisite Corpse, Art Design Cafe and Narrative Magazine. In 2007, her collection of satirical erotic horror and science fiction stories Deep Inside was published. In 2010, her humor collection With One Eye Open was published. She has toured the United States performing her shows Bad Role Models and What I Learned from Them and How to Survive Your Adult Relationship with Your Family.

== Books ==
Frost published a collection of essays, stories, and humor pieces in 2010 with the title With One Eye Open (Rapture House). She also co-wrote The Bannings (2012) with her husband Ray Sawhill. She is a contributing author for several other books, including Deep Inside: Extreme Erotic Fantasies and two collections of humor that were originally published in The New Yorker magazine: Fierce Pajamas and Disquiet, Please.

== Family ==
Frost is married to Ray Sawhill.

== See also ==
- List of horror fiction authors
