= Robert Frost Middle School =

Robert Frost Middle School may refer to:

- Robert Frost Middle School (Granada Hills, California)
- Robert Frost Middle School (Fairfax County, Virginia)
- Robert Frost Middle School (Montgomery County, Maryland)
