= Jack Frost (footballer, born 1920) =

English footballer

Personal information
- Full name: John Frost
- Date of birth: 13 February 1920
- Place of birth: Wallsend, Northumberland, England
- Date of death: q1 1988 (aged 67–68)
- Place of death: York, North Yorkshire, England
- Height: 6 ft 1 in (1.85 m)
- Position: Goalkeeper

Senior career*
Years	Team	Apps	(Gls)
–1939	North Shields		
1939–1948	Grimsby Town	0	(0)
1948–1951	York City	45	(0)
Total		45	(0)
- * Club domestic league appearances and goals

John Frost (13 February 1920 – q1 1988) was an English professional footballer who played as a goalkeeper in the Football League for York City, in non-League football for North Shields and was on the books of Grimsby Town without making a league appearance.
