= Daniel Frost =

Daniel Frost may refer to:

- Daniel M. Frost (1823–1900), United States Army general
- Daniel E. Frost (1819–1864), American journalist, politician and soldier
- Daniel Frost (earth scientist) (born 1970), British earth scientist

== See also ==
- Danial Frost, Singaporean racing driver
- Dan Frost (disambiguation)
