= Thomas Frost =

Thomas Frost may refer to:

- Thomas Frost (producer) (1925–2026), American classical music producer
- Thomas Frost (fl. 1870s), Australian architect, designer of additions to Brougham Place Uniting Church in Adelaide, South Australia
- Thomas Frost (writer) (1821–1908), English journalist
- Thomas N. Frost (died 1969), American politician from Virginia
- Tom Frost (1936–2018), rock climber
- Thomas Frost, character in the television series Dominion
