= John K. Frost =

- Born: c. 1922; Sioux Falls, South Dakota
- Died: August 29, 1990; Baltimore, Maryland
- Occupation: Physician
- Known for: one of the founders of the field of cytopathology
- Spouse: Moira Keane
- Children: 7

John Kingsbury Frost (c. 1922 – 1990) was an American physician specializing in the field of cytopathology - the microscopic study of individual body cells to detect cancer and other diseases. The first area of the body to be studied in this way was the female genital tract, using the Pap smear invented by Georgios Papanikolaou. Frost and other physicians expanded the field to allow for cytopathologic evaluation of the lung, bladder, and many other body sites. Frost was best known as a teacher of cytopathology. He organized and directed a school of cytotechnology and created and led a postgraduate Institute to teach the techniques to physicians.

== Early life and education ==
Frost was born in Sioux Falls, South Dakota. He attended the University of California, Berkeley for his undergraduate degree. He received his medical degree from the University of California, San Francisco. He served in the United States Army for five years, 1948 to 1953, attaining the rank of lieutenant colonel.

== Career ==
In 1956 he took a position as an assistant professor of obstetrics and gynecology at Johns Hopkins Hospital in Baltimore, Maryland, where he remained for his entire career until his retirement in 1989. In 1959 he was the founding head of the division of cytopathology and continued to direct the division for 30 years.

He was the author of 347 publications, including the definitive monograph on the subject of cytopathology, The Cell in Health and Disease, published in 1969 with a second edition in 1986.

In addition to diagnostic services and professional training, his laboratory also carried out research, notably in the creation of the dyes (stains) which are used to highlight the characteristics of the cells so they can be evaluated. The most popular nuclear stain, the Gill hematoxylin series, was created in Frost's cytopathology department in the 1970s by cytotechnologist Gary W. Gill.

Frost died August 29, 1990, in Baltimore. The cause of death was from complications of therapy of lung cancer, although he was a lifelong nonsmoker.

== Recognition ==
The division he founded and led at Hopkins is now named the John K. Frost Cytopathology Laboratory.

In 1979 he received the Maurice Goldblatt Cytology Award from the International Academy of Cytology. It is the highest award in the field. The citation described him as "the most prominent educator and teacher of cytopathology in the United States."
