= Mark Frost (disambiguation) =

Mark Frost (born 1953) is an American screenwriter, producer and director.

Mark Frost may also refer to:

- Mark Frost (cricketer) (born 1962), English cricketer
- Mark Frost (actor) (born 1969), English actor
- Mark Frost (darts player) (born 1971), English darts player
- Attila Stefáni, Hungarian speedway rider who rode under pseudonym of Mark Frost
