= Wakebridge =

Hamlet in Derbyshire, England

Coordinates: 53.097°N 1.496°W

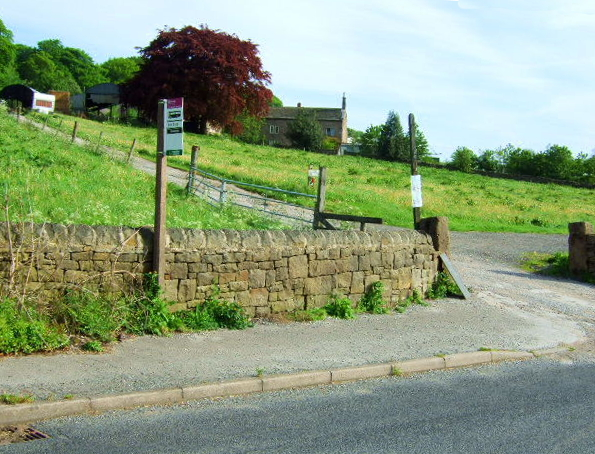
- Entrance to Wakebridge Farm in 2007, since closed

- Location within Derbyshire
- OS grid reference: SK338556
- Civil parish: Crich
- District: Amber Valley
- Shire county: Derbyshire
- Region: East Midlands
- Country: England
- Sovereign state: United Kingdom
- Post town: MATLOCK
- Postcode district: DE4
- Police: Derbyshire
- Fire: Derbyshire
- Ambulance: East Midlands

Wakebridge is a hamlet in the civil parish of Crich, in the Amber Valley district of Derbyshire, England. It is located 1-mile (1.6 km) north-west of the village of Crich and lies close to Crich Quarry.

Wakebridge Farm is a former dairy farm including a Grade II listed late 18th century farmhouse and attached stone barns, built by Peter Nightingale on the site of a medieval manor house and chapel. The farm sits in a small valley overlooking the Derwent Valley. On the adjacent hillside is the Grade II* listed Crich Stand, as well as the National Tramway Museum, a popular tourist attraction.
