= Charles Frost =

Charles Frost may refer to:

- Charles Frost (antiquary) (1781–1862), English lawyer and antiquary
- Charles Frost (military officer), (1631–1697), Maine
- Charles Frost (naturalist), (1853?–1915), Australian author and collector of reptiles
- Charles Frost (politician) (1882–1964), Australian politician
- Charles Christopher Frost (1805–1880), American botanist
- Charles Sumner Frost (1856–1931), American architect

== See also ==
- C. F. Frost, the placeholder name on American Express credit cards
- Charlie Frost, a character in the 2009 film 2012
