= Wenlan Hu Frost =

American painter

- Born: Hu Wenlan; 1958 (age 67–68); Chengdu, Sichuan, China
- Known for: Painting
- Movement: Abstract Symbolism

Chinese Calligraphy 2.0 - The Love Character Abstract Symbolism Series: The Love of Ohio 1.0
- Artist: Wenlan Hu Frost
- Year: 2007
- Type: Acrylic on canvas
- Dimensions: 122 cm × 122 cm (48 in × 48 in)
- Location: Butler Institute of American Art

Wenlan Hu Frost (Chinese: 胡文兰; simplified Chinese: 胡文兰; traditional Chinese: 胡文蘭; pinyin: Hú Wénlán), (born 1958 in Chengdu, Sichuan, China) is an American painter living in Houston, Texas. She developed the Abstract Symbolism painting style in 2007 and is the first artist to present the Chinese character as a symbolic abstract art form on a Western medium, as seen in her Chinese Calligraphy 2.0 – The Love Character Abstract Symbolism Series. Her works are in the collection of the Butler Institute of American Art, where she had her first solo museum exhibition in 2008.
