= Dan Frost =

Dan Frost may refer to:

- Dan Frost (cyclist) (born 1961), Danish cyclist
- Dan Frost (rugby union)

== See also ==
- Daniel Frost (disambiguation)
