= Lilian Frost =

Lilian Mary Frost (c. 1871 – 22 December 1953) was an Australian organist, who for many years gave popular recitals at the Pitt Street Congregational Church, Sydney.

== History ==
Frost was born in Launceston, Tasmania, to draper and rifle marksman John Frost (c. 1837 – 23 September 1912) and his wife Amelia Annie Frost, née Sage, (c. 1843 – 22 July 1933) who married on 14 January 1867, and had a home "Belmont", 54 Elphin Road, Launceston.

Her parents took her to London for three years' musical training, and on her return to Australia she was appointed organist of Christ Church, Launceston, and at age 25 was offered the post of organist at Sydney's Pitt Street Congregational Church, which she accepted, and held for over 50 years.

In 1912 she returned to England, where she furthered her education under W. G. Alcock, organist of Salisbury Cathedral, and with Charles-Marie Widor, at the Church of St Sulpice, Paris. She gave several recitals in St George's Hall, Liverpool, and one in the Royal Albert Hall, London.

She returned to Sydney in 1913, when she inaugurated her famous Wednesday lunchtime concerts, which proved popular, and continued for 50 years.

She also took students. She gave encouragement to singers Essie Ackland, Elsie Findlay, and Stanley Clarkson.

In 1923 she shared a concert with the great cellist Jean Gérardy, as accompanist on the Sydney Town Hall organ. Despite the difficulties involved, the concert was a success, and an encore called for — the Gounod-Bach Ave Maria.

She died in St Luke's Hospital, Launceston, at the age of 82 years.

== Family ==
Frost never married. Her siblings include:

- Sydney Frost
- Emma Louisa "Dolly" Frost (5 May 1874 – 26 October 1970)
- Alfred E. Frost (c. 1878 – 25 October 1951) was organist of St Paul's Church and Holy Trinity Church, Launceston. He married Catherine Susannah Holliday on 9 December 1875

They had a home "Belmont", 54 Elphin Road, Launceston, Tasmania.
