= Graham Frost =

English cricketer (born 1947)

Graham Frost (born 15 January 1947, in Old Basford) is an English former first-class cricketer active 1968–73 who played for Nottinghamshire.
