= James Bernard Frost =

American author

James Bernard Frost is an American author. His novels A Very Minor Prophet and World Leader Pretend explore American subcultures. His travel guide for vegetarians, The Artichoke Trail, won a Lowell Thomas Award for travel journalism. He regularly publishes essays on the online magazine The Nervous Breakdown.

== Bibliography ==
- The Artichoke Trail (Hunter Publishing, 2000)
  - 2001 Lowell Thomas Award
- World Leader Pretend (St. Martin's Press, 2007)
- A Very Minor Prophet (Hawthorne Books, 2012)
