= David Frost (disambiguation) =

Sir David Frost (1939–2013) was a British broadcaster.

David Frost may also refer to:

- David Frost, Baron Frost (born 1965), British politician and former diplomat
- David Frost (canoeist) (born 1965), Canadian sprint canoeist
- David Frost (golfer) (born 1959), South African golfer
- David Frost (producer) (fl. 2000s), music producer
- David Frost (ice hockey) (born 1967 or 1968), former NHL Players' Association sports agent
- Dave Frost (1952–2023), retired American baseball player

== See also ==
- David Frost House, a historic house in Cambridge, Massachusetts
- David Forst (born 1976), American baseball executive
