= Kelly Frost =

British writer

- Born: July 1999 (age 27)
- Education: University College London Lincoln College, University of Oxford
- Website: www.kellyfrostwriter.com

Kelly Frost (born 1999) is a British writer. She is the author of two novels. Her debut The Kings Head (2025) was named a Sunday Times historical fiction book of the year.

== Early life and education ==
Frost grew up in Salisbury and was educated at South Wilts Grammar School. She has an undergraduate degree in English from University College London and a Masters degree in American Literature from the University of Oxford. While at Oxford, she published her writing in Cherwell and was Fiction and Poetry Editor at The Oxonian Review.

== Career ==
At 21, she wrote The Kings Head during the Covid pandemic. Atlantic Books won the rights to her "swaggering debut of conflict and camaraderie" in June 2023, with the publishing director for Atlantic Fiction describing it as "one of the most energetic and forceful debuts we've encountered for an age".

The Kings Head was published in February 2025 to widespread acclaim. It was named The Sunday Times historical fiction pick of the month and made their 2025 'best of' historical fiction list. Times critic Nick Rennison said the novel was "not only a compelling story but also an understated celebration of female friendship and a lament for how it changes over time". The Observer also reviewed the novel, praising Frost's "addictive" descriptions and how she "expertly toys with gender and explores young people’s place in the world". Stylist magazine included The Kings Head in its best new books of 2025 list, and international bestseller Joseph O'Connor chose The Kings Head as one of the best books for summer 2025 in The Irish Times, calling her a "writer to watch".

Her second novel The Racing Line was published in June 2026, also with Atlantic Books. Spanning 1945 to the late 1960s, it tells the story of Winifred 'Freddy' Vaux who pursues a career in the male-dominated world of motorsport. Frost has talked about how she was inspired to write the novel by the stories of female racing pioneers Maria Theresa de Filippis, Rosemary Smith and Lella Lombardi. The Sunday Times once again reviewed Frost's novel, choosing it as pick of the month for June.

== Personal life ==
Frost is a trained journalist and was a reporter in Jersey for two years. She now lives in London.

== Works ==
- The Kings Head (Atlantic Books, 2025) ISBN 9781805462408.
- The Racing Line (Atlantic Books, 2026) ISBN 9781805465836.
