= Andy Frost (sculptor) =

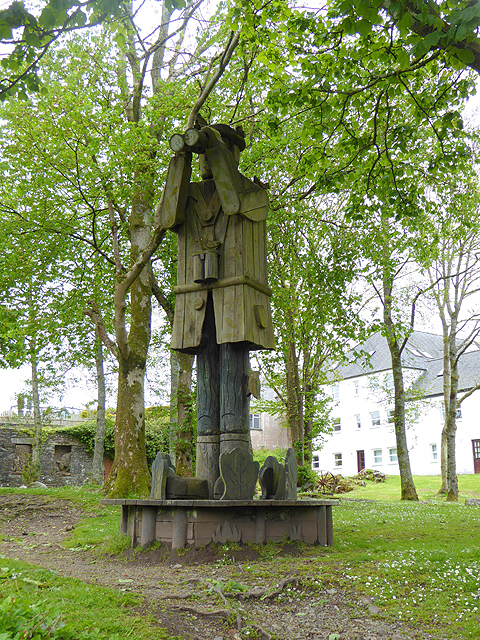
Big Twitcher, created by Andy Frost in 1997 and situated in Gatehouse of Fleet, Scotland

Andy Frost or Andrew Frost is an English sculptor, born in Bedford in 1957. He studied at Lanchester Polytechnic (now Coventry University) and the University of Reading. He was the Henry Moore Foundation Fellow in Sculpture at Camberwell School of Arts and Crafts.
